The Atlanta Hawks is an NBA team based in Atlanta, Georgia. The team's origins can be traced to the establishment of the Buffalo Bisons in 1946 in Buffalo, New York. The franchise lasted only 38 days in Buffalo when, on December 25, 1946, Leo Ferris, the team's general manager, announced that the team would be moving to Moline, Illinois, which at that time was part of an area then known as the "Tri-Cities": Moline, Rock Island, Illinois, and Davenport, Iowa. Upon relocation to Moline, the team was renamed the Tri-Cities Blackhawks. In 1949, the Blackhawks became one of the NBA's 17 original teams after a merger of the twelve-year-old National Basketball League (NBL) and the three-year-old Basketball Association of America (BAA). In 1950, the franchise relocated to Milwaukee, Wisconsin, and became the Milwaukee Hawks. In 1955 the Hawks moved to St. Louis, Missouri and became the St. Louis Hawks. And in 1965 moved to Atlanta, Georgia which became the Atlanta Hawks.

The following is a list of players, both past and current, who appeared at least in one game for the Atlanta Hawks franchise.



Players
Note: Statistics are correct through the end of the  season.

A to B

|-
|align="left" bgcolor="#FFCC00"|+ || align="center"|F || align="left"|California || align="center"|3 || align="center"|– || 211 || 8,023 || 1,868 || 608 || 4,309 || 38.0 || 8.9 || 2.9 || 20.4 || align=center|
|-
|align="left"| || align="center"|F || align="left"|Northwestern || align="center"|2 || align="center"|– || 74 || 2,106 || 516 || 142 || 841 || 28.5 || 7.0 || 1.9 || 11.4 || align=center|
|-
|align="left"| || align="center"|G || align="left"|St. Bonaventure || align="center"|1 || align="center"| || 34 || 428 || 60 || 65 || 108 || 12.6 || 1.8 || 1.9 || 3.2 || align=center|
|-
|align="left"| || align="center"|F || align="left"|Duquesne || align="center"|1 || align="center"| || 2 || 11 || 4 || 0 || 0 || 5.5 || 2.0 || 0.0 || 0.0 || align=center|
|-
|align="left"| || align="center"|F/C || align="left"|Houston || align="center"|2 || align="center"| || 101 || 1,020 || 306 || 32 || 236 || 10.1 || 3.0 || 0.3 || 2.3 || align=center|
|-
|align="left"| || align="center"|G || align="left"|Virginia || align="center"|1 || align="center"| || 48 || 463 || 84 || 23 || 178 || 9.6 || 1.8 || 0.5 || 3.7 || align=center|
|-
|align="left"| || align="center"|G || align="left"|Georgia Tech || align="center"|1 || align="center"| || 39 || 717 || 83 || 98 || 195 || 18.4 || 2.1 || 2.5 || 5.0 || align=center|
|-
|align="left"| || align="center"|F/C || align="left"|North  Macedonia || align="center"|2 || align="center"|– || 113 || 1,962 || 398 || 107 || 708 || 17.4 || 3.5 || 0.9 || 6.3 || align=center|
|-
|align="left"| || align="center"|F || align="left"|Iowa State || align="center"|1 || align="center"| || 7 || 110 || 32 || 4 || 50 || 15.7 || 4.6 || 0.6 || 7.1 || align=center|
|-
|align="left"| || align="center"|F/C || align="left"|UConn || align="center"|1 || align="center"| || 12 || 76 || 17 || 4 || 15 || 6.3 || 1.4 || 0.3 || 1.3 || align=center|
|-
|align="left"| || align="center"|G/F || align="left"|UNLV || align="center"|5 || align="center"|– || 390 || 11,878 || 1,773 || 892 || 5,356 || 30.5 || 4.5 || 2.3 || 13.7 || align=center|
|-
|align="left"| || align="center"|C || align="left"|Mexico || align="center"|1 || align="center"| || 26 || 429 || 125 || 28 || 112 || 16.5 || 4.8 || 1.1 || 4.3 || align=center|
|-
|align="left"| || align="center"|F || align="left"|Nevada || align="center"|1 || align="center"| || 37 || 570 || 81 || 26 || 226 || 15.4 || 2.2 || 0.7 || 6.1 || align=center|
|-
|align="left"| || align="center"|G || align="left"|Boston College || align="center"|1 || align="center"| || 3 || 13 || 1 || 3 || 2 || 4.3 || 0.3 || 1.0 || 0.7 || align=center|
|-
|align="left"| || align="center"|F || align="left"|Cal State Los Angeles || align="center"|1 || align="center"| || 5 || 19 || 6 || 0 || 7 || 3.8 || 1.2 || 0.0 || 1.4 || align=center|
|-
|align="left"| || align="center"|F/C || align="left"|Hawaii || align="center"|1 || align="center"| || 59 || 1,354 || 401 || 60 || 476 || 22.9 || 6.8 || 1.0 || 8.1 || align=center|
|-
|align="left"| || align="center"|G || align="left"|Tennessee State || align="center"|4 || align="center"|– || 223 || 5,527 || 698 || 626 || 1,936 || 24.8 || 3.1 || 2.8 || 8.7 || align=center|
|-
|align="left"| || align="center"|G || align="left"|Georgia Tech || align="center"|2 || align="center"| || 35 || 330 || 39 || 65 || 75 || 9.4 || 1.1 || 1.9 || 2.1 || align=center|
|-
|align="left"| || align="center"|G || align="left"|Georgia Tech || align="center"|2 || align="center"| || 74 || 1,240 || 120 || 143 || 368 || 16.8 || 1.6 || 1.9 || 5.0 || align=center|
|-
|align="left"| || align="center"|F/C || align="left"|Uruguay || align="center"|2 || align="center"|– || 70 || 576 || 174 || 11 || 121 || 8.2 || 2.5 || 0.2 || 1.7 || align=center|
|-
|align="left"| || align="center"|G || align="left"|Rutgers || align="center"|6 || align="center"|– || 416 || 7,682 || 633 || 924 || 3,882 || 18.5 || 1.5 || 2.2 || 9.3 || align=center|
|-
|align="left"| || align="center"|G || align="left"|Russia || align="center"|1 || align="center"| || 10 || 74 || 7 || 14 || 30 || 7.4 || 0.7 || 1.4 || 3.0 || align=center|
|-
|align="left"| || align="center"|G/F || align="left"|Old Dominion || align="center"|5 || align="center"|– || 355 || 8,802 || 1,341 || 806 || 3,678 || 24.8 || 3.8 || 2.3 || 10.4 || align=center|
|-
|align="left"| || align="center"|F || align="left"|West Virginia || align="center"|1 || align="center"| || 1 ||  || 0 || 1 || 0 ||  || 0.0 || 1.0 || 0.0 || align=center|
|-
|align="left"| || align="center"|G || align="left"|Louisville || align="center"|1 || align="center"| || 72 || 941 || 140 || 121 || 501 || 13.1 || 1.9 || 1.7 || 7.0 || align=center|
|-
|align="left" bgcolor="#FFFF99"|^ || align="center"|C || align="left"|Prairie View A&M || align="center"|7 || align="center"|– || 501 || 17,135 || 5,622 || 765 || 8,727 || 34.2 || 11.2 || 1.5 || 17.4 || align=center|
|-
|align="left"| || align="center"|G/F || align="left"|Penn || align="center"|1 || align="center"| || 7 || 62 || 12 || 13 || 19 || 8.9 || 1.7 || 1.9 || 2.7 || align=center|
|-
|align="left"| || align="center"|F/C || align="left"|Minnesota || align="center"|1 || align="center"| || 26 || 571 || 173 || 34 || 285 || 22.0 || 6.7 || 1.3 || 11.0 || align=center|
|-
|align="left"| || align="center"|C || align="left"|Bradley || align="center"|1 || align="center"| || 4 || 55 || 17 || 4 || 16 || 13.8 || 4.3 || 1.0 || 4.0 || align=center|
|-
|align="left"| || align="center"|G/F || align="left"|Italy || align="center"|1 || align="center"| || 52 || 1,210 || 100 || 103 || 591 || 23.3 || 1.9 || 2.0 || 11.4 || align=center|
|-
|align="left" bgcolor="#FFFF99"|^ || align="center"|C || align="left"|Indiana || align="center"|5 || align="center"|– || 338 || 12,192 || 4,123 || 948 || 5,289 || 36.1 || 12.2 || 2.8 || 15.6 || align=center|
|-
|align="left" bgcolor="#CCFFCC"|x || align="center"|F || align="left"|Saint Joseph's || align="center"|3 || align="center"|– || 146 || 2,757 || 489 || 279 || 924 || 18.9 || 3.3 || 1.9 || 6.3 || align=center|
|-
|align="left"| || align="center"|G/F || align="left"|Illinois || align="center"|2 || align="center"| || 131 || 2,479 || 341 || 125 || 827 || 18.9 || 2.6 || 1.0 || 6.3 || align=center|
|-
|align="left"| || align="center"|G || align="left"|Oregon State || align="center"|1 || align="center"| || 9 || 152 || 31 || 10 || 40 || 16.9 || 3.4 || 1.1 || 4.4 || align=center|
|-
|align="left"| || align="center"|G/F || align="left"|Marquette || align="center"|1 || align="center"| || 3 ||  ||  || 2 || 10 ||  ||  || 0.7 || 3.3 || align=center|
|-
|align="left"| || align="center"|G || align="left"|Arizona || align="center"|4 || align="center"|– || 248 || 7,709 || 709 || 1,119 || 2,896 || 31.1 || 2.9 || 4.5 || 11.7 || align=center|
|-
|align="left"| || align="center"|F/C || align="left"|Kansas || align="center"|1 || align="center"| || 13 || 117 || 31 || 9 || 17 || 9.0 || 2.4 || 0.7 || 1.3 || align=center|
|-
|align="left" bgcolor="#FFCC00"|+ || align="center"|G || align="left"|Oklahoma || align="center"|7 || align="center"|– || 518 || 19,216 || 2,407 || 3,764 || 7,743 || 37.1 || 4.6 || 7.3 || 14.9 || align=center|
|-
|align="left"| || align="center"|G/F || align="left"|Western Michigan || align="center"|2 || align="center"|– || 93 || 2,649 || 434 || 212 || 897 || 28.5 || 4.7 || 2.3 || 9.6 || align=center|
|-
|align="left"| || align="center"|F || align="left"|Old Dominion || align="center"|3 || align="center"|– || 142 || 1,383 || 272 || 29 || 424 || 9.7 || 1.9 || 0.2 || 3.0 || align=center|
|-
|align="left"| || align="center"|G || align="left"|Penn || align="center"|1 || align="center"| || 3 || 19 || 2 || 7 || 0 || 6.3 || 0.7 || 2.3 || 0.0 || align=center|
|-
|align="left"| || align="center"|G || align="left"|Colorado || align="center"|2 || align="center"|– || 30 || 195 || 25 || 16 || 79 || 6.5 || 0.8 || 0.5 || 2.6 || align=center|
|-
|align="left"| || align="center"|C || align="left"|St. John's || align="center"|1 || align="center"| || 16 ||  || 85 || 20 || 125 ||  || 5.3 || 1.3 || 7.8 || align=center|
|-
|align="left"| || align="center"|G || align="left"|UCLA || align="center"|1 || align="center"| || 23 || 199 || 23 || 9 || 26 || 8.7 || 1.0 || 0.4 || 1.1 || align=center|
|-
|align="left"| || align="center"|G || align="left"|Tulsa || align="center"|2 || align="center"|– || 145 || 2,513 || 253 || 356 || 1,008 || 17.3 || 1.7 || 2.5 || 7.0 || align=center|
|-
|align="left"| || align="center"|G/F || align="left"|North Carolina || align="center"|1 || align="center"| || 38 || 267 || 32 || 24 || 72 || 7.0 || 0.8 || 0.6 || 1.9 || align=center|
|-
|align="left"| || align="center"|F/C || align="left"|Villanova || align="center"|1 || align="center"| || 11 || 60 || 12 || 0 || 12 || 5.5 || 1.1 || 0.0 || 1.1 || align=center|
|-
|align="left"| || align="center"|F || align="left"|Duke || align="center"|2 || align="center"|– || 109 || 1,900 || 461 || 96 || 515 || 17.4 || 4.2 || 0.9 || 4.7 || align=center|
|-
|align="left"| || align="center"|G || align="left"|NYU || align="center"|1 || align="center"| || 10 || 137 || 9 || 9 || 44 || 13.7 || 0.9 || 0.9 || 4.4 || align=center|
|-
|align="left"| || align="center"|C || align="left"|Minnesota || align="center"|1 || align="center"| || 12 || 107 || 28 || 6 || 32 || 8.9 || 2.3 || 0.5 || 2.7 || align=center|
|-
|align="left" bgcolor="#FFCC00"|+ || align="center"|G || align="left"|LSU || align="center"|1 || align="center"| || 68 ||  || 244 || 266 || 1,144 ||  || 3.6 || 3.9 || 16.8 || align=center|
|-
|align="left" bgcolor="#FFCC00"|+ || align="center"|F/C || align="left"|Kansas || align="center"|10 || align="center"|– || 683 || 23,574 || 8,656 || 1,997 || 8,685 || 34.5 || 12.7 || 2.9 || 12.7 || align=center|
|-
|align="left"| || align="center"|F || align="left"|NC State || align="center"|1 || align="center"| || 77 || 1,202 || 183 || 55 || 387 || 15.6 || 2.4 || 0.7 || 5.0 || align=center|
|-
|align="left"| || align="center"|F || align="left"|Missouri || align="center"|6 || align="center"|– || 405 || 8,819 || 1,879 || 595 || 3,222 || 21.8 || 4.6 || 1.5 || 8.0 || align=center|
|-
|align="left"| || align="center"|F/C || align="left"|Mississippi State || align="center"|3 || align="center"|– || 163 || 1,904 || 492 || 63 || 554 || 11.7 || 3.0 || 0.4 || 3.4 || align=center|
|-
|align="left"| || align="center"|G/F || align="left"|Argentina || align="center"|1 || align="center"| || 4 || 10 || 3 || 0 || 0 || 2.5 || 0.8 || 0.0 || 0.0 || align=center|
|-
|align="left"| || align="center"|F || align="left"|Iowa || align="center"|1 || align="center"| || 46 || 460 || 60 || 18 || 174 || 10.0 || 1.3 || 0.4 || 3.8 || align=center|
|-
|align="left"| || align="center"|C || align="left"|NC State || align="center"|1 || align="center"| || 31 || 363 || 94 || 12 || 102 || 11.7 || 3.0 || 0.4 || 3.3 || align=center|
|-
|align="left"| || align="center"|F || align="left"|Tennessee || align="center"|1 || align="center"| || 12 || 269 || 50 || 16 || 67 || 22.4 || 4.2 || 1.3 || 5.6 || align=center|
|-
|align="left"| || align="center"|F || align="left"|Michigan State || align="center"|1 || align="center"| || 7 || 42 || 13 || 2 || 18 || 6.0 || 1.9 || 0.3 || 2.6 || align=center|
|-
|align="left"| || align="center"|G/F || align="left"|Minnesota || align="center"|1 || align="center"| || 24 || 380 || 41 || 11 || 148 || 15.8 || 1.7 || 0.5 || 6.2 || align=center|
|-
|align="left"| || align="center"|G/F || align="left"|Seton Hall || align="center"|1 || align="center"| || 19 ||  || 33 || 32 || 87 ||  || 1.7 || 1.7 || 4.6 || align=center|
|}

C

|-
|align="left"| || align="center"|F || align="left"|Bradley || align="center"|2 || align="center"|– || 94 || 2,025 || 609 || 126 || 777 || 21.5 || 6.5 || 1.3 || 8.3 || align=center|
|-
|align="left"| || align="center"|G || align="left"|Spain || align="center"|1 || align="center"| || 17 || 247 || 32 || 37 || 61 || 14.5 || 1.9 || 2.2 || 3.6 || align=center|
|-
|align="left" bgcolor="#FFCC00"|+ || align="center"|G/F || align="left"|Arizona State || align="center"|5 || align="center"|– || 369 || 11,615 || 1,736 || 1,074 || 6,072 || 31.5 || 4.7 || 2.9 || 16.5 || align=center|
|-
|align="left"| || align="center"|G/F || align="left"|CC San Francisco || align="center"|3 || align="center"|– || 190 || 6,388 || 814 || 565 || 1,555 || 33.6 || 4.3 || 3.0 || 8.2 || align=center|
|-
|align="left"| || align="center"|F/C || align="left"|East Texas State || align="center"|1 || align="center"| || 35 ||  || 167 || 63 || 222 ||  || 4.8 || 1.8 || 6.3 || align=center|
|-
|align="left"| || align="center"|F/C || align="left"|Wichita State || align="center"|6 || align="center"|– || 346 || 5,922 || 1,152 || 375 || 2,579 || 17.1 || 3.3 || 1.1 || 7.5 || align=center|
|-
|align="left"| || align="center"|F || align="left"|Missouri || align="center"|2 || align="center"|– || 143 || 4,530 || 775 || 252 || 1,693 || 31.7 || 5.4 || 1.8 || 11.8 || align=center|
|-
|align="left" bgcolor="#CCFFCC"|x || align="center"|G/F || align="left"|North Carolina || align="center"|1 || align="center"| || 76 || 1,330 || 194 || 87 || 562 || 17.5 || 2.6 || 1.1 || 7.4 || align=center|
|-
|align="left"| || align="center"|F || align="left"|George Washington || align="center"|1 || align="center"| || 39 || 518 || 127 || 27 || 183 || 13.3 || 3.3 || 0.7 || 4.7 || align=center|
|-
|align="left"| || align="center"|F || align="left"|Utah || align="center"|1 || align="center"| || 65 || 1,168 || 245 || 61 || 580 || 18.0 || 3.8 || 0.9 || 8.9 || align=center|
|-
|align="left"| || align="center"|F/C || align="left"|LSU || align="center"|1 || align="center"| || 6 ||  ||  || 15 || 28 ||  ||  || 2.5 || 4.7 || align=center|
|-
|align="left"| || align="center"|F/C || align="left"|Wake Forest || align="center"|1 || align="center"| || 42 || 451 || 133 || 16 || 202 || 10.7 || 3.2 || 0.4 || 4.8 || align=center|
|-
|align="left"| || align="center"|G || align="left"|Fordham || align="center"|2 || align="center"|– || 103 || 3,007 || 192 || 377 || 1,101 || 29.2 || 1.9 || 3.7 || 10.7 || align=center|
|-
|align="left"| || align="center"|F || align="left"|NC State || align="center"|1 || align="center"| || 36 || 273 || 39 || 8 || 122 || 7.6 || 1.1 || 0.2 || 3.4 || align=center|
|-
|align="left" bgcolor="#FFFF99"|^ || align="center"|G || align="left"|West Texas A&M || align="center"|1 || align="center"| || 56 || 1,086 || 95 || 185 || 259 || 19.4 || 1.7 || 3.3 || 4.6 || align=center|
|-
|align="left"| || align="center"|G/F || align="left"|Stanford || align="center"|4 || align="center"|– || 285 || 8,923 || 1,582 || 526 || 3,162 || 31.3 || 5.6 || 1.8 || 11.1 || align=center|
|-
|align="left"| || align="center"|F/C || align="left"|Toledo || align="center"|2 || align="center"|– || 91 || 374 || 605 || 195 || 531 || 15.6 || 6.6 || 2.1 || 5.8 || align=center|
|-
|align="left"| || align="center"|C || align="left"|Grambling State || align="center"|3 || align="center"|– || 165 || 1,768 || 663 || 105 || 556 || 10.7 || 4.0 || 0.6 || 3.4 || align=center|
|-
|align="left"| || align="center"|G || align="left"|Hofstra || align="center"|2 || align="center"| || 44 || 1,069 || 81 || 188 || 226 || 24.3 || 1.8 || 4.3 || 5.1 || align=center|
|-
|align="left"| || align="center"|G || align="left"|Southeast Missouri State || align="center"|1 || align="center"| || 4 || 42 || 4 || 0 || 13 || 10.5 || 1.0 || 0.0 || 3.3 || align=center|
|-
|align="left"| || align="center"|F/C || align="left"|Louisville || align="center"|3 || align="center"|– || 185 || 5,020 || 1,474 || 423 || 1,779 || 27.1 || 8.0 || 2.3 || 9.6 || align=center|
|-
|align="left"| || align="center"|G || align="left"|Virginia Tech || align="center"|1 || align="center"| || 80 || 1,924 || 172 || 290 || 645 || 24.1 || 2.2 || 3.6 || 8.1 || align=center|
|-
|align="left"| || align="center"|C || align="left"|Georgia Tech || align="center"|2 || align="center"|– || 90 || 1,487 || 295 || 35 || 628 || 16.5 || 3.3 || 0.4 || 7.0 || align=center|
|-
|align="left"| || align="center"|G || align="left"|St. Thomas || align="center"|1 || align="center"| || 29 || 395 || 41 || 25 || 94 || 13.6 || 1.4 || 0.9 || 3.2 || align=center|
|-
|align="left"| || align="center"|G/F || align="left"|Washington State || align="center"|1 || align="center"| || 47 || 1,184 || 187 || 115 || 597 || 25.2 || 4.0 || 2.4 || 12.7 || align=center|
|-
|align="left"| || align="center"|C || align="left"|Stanford || align="center"|3 || align="center"|– || 103 || 1,016 || 164 || 36 || 151 || 9.9 || 1.6 || 0.3 || 1.5 || align=center|
|-
|align="left" bgcolor="#CCFFCC"|x || align="center"|F || align="left"|Wake Forest || align="center"|2 || align="center"|– || 135 || 3,614 || 1,136 || 219 || 1,965 || 26.8 || 8.4 || 1.6 || 14.6 || align=center|
|-
|align="left"| || align="center"|G || align="left"|Charlotte || align="center"|1 || align="center"| || 3 || 14 || 3 || 3 || 0 || 4.7 || 1.0 || 1.0 || 0.0 || align=center|
|-
|align="left" bgcolor="#FFFF99"|^ || align="center"|F || align="left"|Duquesne || align="center"|2 || align="center"|– || 105 || 2,323 || 523 || 212 || 751 || 22.1 || 5.0 || 2.0 || 7.2 || align=center|
|-
|align="left"| || align="center"|G/F || align="left"|DePaul || align="center"|4 || align="center"|– || 277 || 7,459 || 1,063 || 407 || 2,326 || 26.9 || 3.8 || 1.5 || 8.4 || align=center|
|-
|align="left"| || align="center"|G || align="left"|Georgetown || align="center"|1 || align="center"| || 18 ||  || 43 || 38 || 74 ||  || 2.4 || 2.1 || 4.1 || align=center|
|-
|align="left"| || align="center"|F || align="left"|Marquette || align="center"|7 || align="center"|– || 252 || 3,985 || 547 || 154 || 1,654 || 15.8 || 2.2 || 0.6 || 6.6 || align=center|
|-
|align="left"| || align="center"|G || align="left"|Michigan || align="center"|2 || align="center"|– || 155 || 4,757 || 331 || 479 || 2,502 || 30.7 || 2.1 || 3.1 || 16.1 || align=center|
|-
|align="left"| || align="center"|G || align="left"|Xavier || align="center"|1 || align="center"| || 16 || 160 || 28 || 15 || 67 || 10.0 || 1.8 || 0.9 || 4.2 || align=center|
|-
|align="left"| || align="center"|F || align="left"|Colorado || align="center"|1 || align="center"| || 32 || 172 || 45 || 4 || 31 || 5.4 || 1.4 || 0.1 || 1.0 || align=center|
|-
|align="left"| || align="center"|G || align="left"|New Mexico State || align="center"|7 || align="center"|–– || 318 || 7,091 || 460 || 1,079 || 2,732 || 22.3 || 1.4 || 3.4 || 8.6 || align=center|
|-
|align="left"| || align="center"|G/F || align="left"|Western Michigan || align="center"|2 || align="center"|– || 93 || 1,536 || 212 || 120 || 614 || 16.5 || 2.3 || 1.3 || 6.6 || align=center|
|-
|align="left"| || align="center"|G || align="left"|Oregon State || align="center"|1 || align="center"| || 5 || 22 || 1 || 3 || 2 || 4.4 || 0.2 || 0.6 || 0.4 || align=center|
|}

D

|-
|align="left"| || align="center"|C || align="left"|Mississippi State || align="center"|1 || align="center"| || 15 || 83 || 25 || 4 || 2 || 5.5 || 1.7 || 0.3 || 0.1 || align=center|
|-
|align="left"| || align="center"|C || align="left"|Oklahoma State || align="center"|1 || align="center"| || 12 || 90 || 10 || 2 || 11 || 7.5 || 0.8 || 0.2 || 0.9 || align=center|
|-
|align="left"| || align="center"|G || align="left"|Bowling Green || align="center"|1 || align="center"| || 5 || 34 || 7 || 6 || 12 || 6.8 || 1.4 || 1.2 || 2.4 || align=center|
|-
|align="left"| || align="center"|F/C || align="left"|Michigan State || align="center"|1 || align="center"| || 9 || 118 || 36 || 5 || 36 || 13.1 || 4.0 || 0.6 || 4.0 || align=center|
|-
|align="left"| || align="center"|G || align="left"|Delaware State || align="center"|2 || align="center"|– || 52 || 1,114 || 117 || 104 || 273 || 21.4 || 2.3 || 2.0 || 5.3 || align=center|
|-
|align="left"| || align="center"|F/C || align="left"|Colorado || align="center"|5 || align="center"|– || 303 || 6,367 || 2,030 || 464 || 2,650 || 21.0 || 6.7 || 1.5 || 8.7 || align=center|
|-
|align="left"| || align="center"|G || align="left"|Dayton || align="center"|3 || align="center"|– || 155 || 3,946 || 286 || 753 || 1,754 || 25.5 || 1.8 || 4.9 || 11.3 || align=center|
|-
|align="left"| || align="center"|F || align="left"|Wyoming || align="center"|1 || align="center"| || 4 || 23 || 5 || 0 || 5 || 5.8 || 1.3 || 0.0 || 1.3 || align=center|
|-
|align="left"| || align="center"|G/F || align="left"|Washington State || align="center"|1 || align="center"| || 7 || 67 || 7 || 2 || 20 || 9.6 || 1.0 || 0.3 || 2.9 || align=center|
|-
|align="left"| || align="center"|F/C || align="left"|Texas A&M || align="center"|1 || align="center"| || 26 || 287 || 86 || 11 || 127 || 11.0 || 3.3 || 0.4 || 4.9 || align=center|
|-
|align="left"| || align="center"|F || align="left"|Gonzaga || align="center"|1 || align="center"| || 8 || 76 || 14 || 8 || 26 || 9.5 || 1.8 || 1.0 || 3.3 || align=center|
|-
|align="left"| || align="center"|C || align="left"|USC || align="center"|2 || align="center"|– || 126 || 3,151 || 969 || 180 || 1,310 || 25.0 || 7.7 || 1.4 || 10.4 || align=center|
|-
|align="left"| || align="center"|F/C || align="left"|Indiana || align="center"|1 || align="center"| || 8 ||  ||  ||  ||  ||  ||  ||  ||  || align=center|
|-
|align="left"| || align="center"|G || align="left"|Virginia Tech || align="center"|2 || align="center"|– || 127 || 2,262 || 223 || 356 || 729 || 17.8 || 1.8 || 2.8 || 5.7 || align=center|
|-
|align="left"| || align="center"|G || align="left"|Kentucky || align="center"|2 || align="center"|– || 57 || 1,347 || 132 || 104 || 669 || 23.6 || 2.3 || 1.8 || 11.7 || align=center|
|-
|align="left"| || align="center"|C || align="left"|Wisconsin-River Falls || align="center"|1 || align="center"| || 17 || 132 || 31 || 14 || 64 || 7.8 || 1.8 || 0.8 || 3.8 || align=center|
|-
|align="left"| || align="center"|C || align="left"|Duke || align="center"|1 || align="center"| || 45 || 700 || 218 || 33 || 239 || 15.6 || 4.8 || 0.7 || 5.3 || align=center|
|-
|align="left"| || align="center"|F/C || align="left"|Clark Atlanta || align="center"|1 || align="center"| || 5 ||  || 18 || 9 || 17 ||  || 3.6 || 1.8 || 3.4 || align=center|
|-
|align="left"| || align="center"|F/C || align="left"|France || align="center"|2 || align="center"|– || 142 || 3,120 || 512 || 331 || 656 || 22.0 || 3.6 || 2.3 || 4.6 || align=center|
|-
|align="left"| || align="center"|G || align="left"|Gonzaga || align="center"|2 || align="center"|– || 73 || 658 || 59 || 103 || 232 || 9.0 || 0.8 || 1.4 || 3.2 || align=center|
|-
|align="left"| || align="center"|G || align="left"|Charleston || align="center"|1 || align="center"| || 6 || 63 || 2 || 11 || 17 || 10.5 || 0.3 || 1.8 || 2.8 || align=center|
|-
|align="left"| || align="center"|G || align="left"|St. Bonaventure || align="center"|1 || align="center"| || 7 || 72 || 13 || 4 || 11 || 10.3 || 1.9 || 0.6 || 1.6 || align=center|
|-
|align="left"| || align="center"|G || align="left"|Oregon || align="center"|2 || align="center"|– || 83 || 1,225 || 173 || 96 || 495 || 14.8 || 2.1 || 1.2 || 6.0 || align=center|
|-
|align="left" bgcolor="#FFCC00"|+ || align="center"|G/F || align="left"|Gardner-Webb || align="center"|8 || align="center"|– || 595 || 18,362 || 4,433 || 957 || 12,621 || 30.9 || 7.5 || 1.6 || 21.2 || align=center|
|-
|align="left"| || align="center"|C || align="left"|Montenegro || align="center"|1 || align="center"| || 71 || 1,435 || 238 || 49 || 597 || 20.2 || 3.4 || 0.7 || 8.4 || align=center|
|-
|align="left"| || align="center"|G || align="left"|Colgate || align="center"|2 || align="center"|– || 44 || 441 || 40 || 83 || 156 || 10.0 || 0.9 || 1.9 || 3.5 || align=center|
|-
|align="left"| || align="center"|G/F || align="left"|Duke || align="center"|1 || align="center"| || 30 || 475 || 68 || 30 || 169 || 15.8 || 2.3 || 1.0 || 5.6 || align=center|
|-
|align="left"| || align="center"|G || align="left"|Syracuse || align="center"|1 || align="center"| || 13 || 130 || 8 || 20 || 36 || 10.0 || 0.6 || 1.5 || 2.8 || align=center|
|-
|align="left"| || align="center"|F || align="left"|DePaul || align="center"|1 || align="center"| || 11 || 91 || 16 || 5 || 16 || 8.3 || 1.5 || 0.5 || 1.5 || align=center|
|}

E to F

|-
|align="left"| || align="center"|G || align="left"|Louisville || align="center"|1 || align="center"| || 3 || 37 || 0 || 4 || 11 || 12.3 || 0.0 || 1.3 || 3.7 || align=center|
|-
|align="left" bgcolor="#FFCC00"|+ || align="center"|G/F || align="left"|Illinois || align="center"|3 || align="center"|– || 182 || 1,616 || 642 || 424 || 2,505 || 32.3 || 5.4 || 2.3 || 13.8 || align=center|
|-
|align="left"| || align="center"|G || align="left"|Purdue || align="center"|1 || align="center"| || 32 || 309 || 39 || 22 || 112 || 9.7 || 1.2 || 0.7 || 3.5 || align=center|
|-
|align="left"| || align="center"|F || align="left"|Florida State || align="center"|2 || align="center"|– || 54 || 319 || 66 || 21 || 110 || 5.9 || 1.2 || 0.4 || 2.0 || align=center|
|-
|align="left"| || align="center"|C || align="left"|Kent State || align="center"|1 || align="center"| || 40 || 296 || 48 || 5 || 70 || 7.4 || 1.2 || 0.1 || 1.8 || align=center|
|-
|align="left"| || align="center"|G/F || align="left"|Washington State || align="center"|3 || align="center"|– || 210 || 5,071 || 682 || 524 || 1,967 || 24.1 || 3.2 || 2.5 || 9.4 || align=center|
|-
|align="left"| || align="center"|G || align="left"|Southeast Missouri State || align="center"|1 || align="center"| || 1 || 10 || 1 || 3 || 2 || 10.0 || 1.0 || 3.0 || 2.0 || align=center|
|-
|align="left"| || align="center"|F/C || align="left"|Maryland || align="center"|1 || align="center"| || 42 || 732 || 179 || 11 || 230 || 17.4 || 4.3 || 0.3 || 5.5 || align=center|
|-
|align="left"| || align="center"|F || align="left"|Notre Dame || align="center"|2 || align="center"|– || 78 || 1,848 || 399 || 77 || 691 || 23.7 || 5.1 || 1.0 || 8.9 || align=center|
|-
|align="left"| || align="center"|F/C || align="left"|Wisconsin || align="center"|1 || align="center"| || 22 ||  ||  || 24 || 164 ||  ||  || 1.1 || 7.5 || align=center|
|-
|align="left"| || align="center"|F || align="left"|Western Kentucky || align="center"|1 || align="center"| || 1 || 5 || 1 || 0 || 2 || 5.0 || 1.0 || 0.0 || 2.0 || align=center|
|-
|align="left"| || align="center"|G || align="left"|Texas || align="center"|3 || align="center"|– || 206 || 3,994 || 481 || 132 || 1,237 || 19.4 || 2.3 || 0.6 || 6.0 || align=center|
|-
|align="left"| || align="center"|F || align="left"|San Francisco || align="center"|4 || align="center"|– || 225 || 4,436 || 870 || 346 || 1,458 || 19.7 || 3.9 || 1.5 || 6.5 || align=center|
|-
|align="left"| || align="center"|G || align="left"|Kentucky || align="center"|1 || align="center"| || 5 || 79 || 7 || 9 || 16 || 15.8 || 1.4 || 1.8 || 3.2 || align=center|
|-
|align="left"| || align="center"|G/F || align="left"|Michigan State || align="center"|5 || align="center"|– || 353 || 7,444 || 818 || 929 || 2,487 || 21.1 || 2.3 || 2.6 || 7.0 || align=center|
|-
|align="left"| || align="center"|G/F || align="left"|Georgia Tech || align="center"|6 || align="center"|– || 353 || 5,914 || 757 || 356 || 2,778 || 16.8 || 2.1 || 1.0 || 7.9 || align=center|
|-
|align="left"| || align="center"|F/C || align="left"|Saint Louis || align="center"|1 || align="center"| || 62 || 875 || 233 || 40 || 364 || 14.1 || 3.8 || 0.6 || 5.9 || align=center|
|-
|align="left"| || align="center"|F/C || align="left"|UTEP || align="center"|1 || align="center"| || 33 || 205 || 56 || 10 || 101 || 6.2 || 1.7 || 0.3 || 3.1 || align=center|
|-
|align="left"| || align="center"|F/C || align="left"|La Salle || align="center"|3 || align="center"|– || 150 || 2,361 || 717 || 155 || 1,105 || 18.9 || 5.7 || 1.2 || 7.4 || align=center|
|-
|align="left"| || align="center"|C || align="left"|Missouri || align="center"|1 || align="center"| || 6 || 41 || 10 || 2 || 9 || 6.8 || 1.7 || 0.3 || 1.5 || align=center|
|-
|align="left"| || align="center"|F || align="left"|Vanderbilt || align="center"|1 || align="center"| || 19 || 147 || 24 || 7 || 40 || 7.7 || 1.3 || 0.4 || 2.1 || align=center|
|-
|align="left"| || align="center"|F || align="left"|Fresno State || align="center"|1 || align="center"| || 4 || 43 || 11 || 2 || 8 || 10.8 || 2.8 || 0.5 || 2.0 || align=center|
|-
|align="left"| || align="center"|G/F || align="left"|Michigan State || align="center"|2 || align="center"|– || 50 || 980 || 113 || 153 || 463 || 19.6 || 2.3 || 3.1 || 9.3 || align=center|
|}

G

|-
|align="left"| || align="center"|F || align="left"|Oregon State || align="center"|2 || align="center"|– || 44 || 7 || 2 || 0 || 2 || 3.5 || 1.0 || 0.0 || 0.0 || align=center|
|-
|align="left"| || align="center"|G || align="left"|Missouri || align="center"|1 || align="center"| || 16 || 98 || 7 || 2 || 24 || 6.1 || 0.4 || 0.1 || 1.5 || align=center|
|-
|align="left"| || align="center"|G/F || align="left"|Washington State || align="center"|1 || align="center"| || 15 ||  || 39 || 13 || 56 ||  || 2.6 || 0.9 || 3.7 || align=center|
|-
|align="left"| || align="center"|G/F || align="left"|Western Kentucky || align="center"|1 || align="center"| || 44 ||  ||  || 126 || 281 ||  ||  || 2.9 || 6.4 || align=center|
|-
|align="left"| || align="center"|G/F || align="left"|Purdue || align="center"|4 || align="center"|– || 280 || 8,474 || 1,205 || 1,384 || 3,496 || 30.3 || 4.3 || 4.9 || 12.5 || align=center|
|-
|align="left"| || align="center"|G/F || align="left"|Kentucky || align="center"|2 || align="center"|– || 156 || 2,601 || 456 || 142 || 1,040 || 16.7 || 2.9 || 0.9 || 6.7 || align=center|
|-
|align="left"| || align="center"|G || align="left"|Southern Illinois || align="center"|4 || align="center"|– || 263 || 4,586 || 336 || 505 || 2,109 || 17.4 || 1.3 || 1.9 || 8.0 || align=center|
|-
|align="left"| || align="center"|G || align="left"|Georgia Tech || align="center"|5 || align="center"|– || 273 || 5,886 || 857 || 436 || 2,318 || 21.6 || 3.1 || 1.6 || 8.5 || align=center|
|-
|align="left"| || align="center"|F/C || align="left"|Roberto Clemente HS (IL) || align="center"|1 || align="center"| || 3 || 28 || 9 || 2 || 8 || 9.3 || 3.0 || 0.7 || 2.7 || align=center|
|-
|align="left"| || align="center"|G || align="left"|Oklahoma || align="center"|1 || align="center"| || 3 || 8 || 1 || 1 || 4 || 2.7 || 0.3 || 0.3 || 1.3 || align=center|
|-
|align="left"| || align="center"|G/F || align="left"|Ohio || align="center"|3 || align="center"|– || 179 || 3,354 || 433 || 352 || 1,499 || 18.7 || 2.4 || 2.0 || 8.4 || align=center|
|-
|align="left"| || align="center"|F || align="left"|New Orleans || align="center"|1 || align="center"| || 4 || 19 || 6 || 1 || 4 || 4.8 || 1.5 || 0.3 || 1.0 || align=center|
|-
|align="left"| || align="center"|G || align="left"|Villanova || align="center"|1 || align="center"| || 9 || 92 || 6 || 12 || 16 || 10.2 || 0.7 || 1.3 || 1.8 || align=center|
|-
|align="left"| || align="center"|G || align="left"|California || align="center"|2 || align="center"|– || 60 || 809 || 73 || 46 || 373 || 13.5 || 1.2 || 0.8 || 6.2 || align=center|
|-
|align="left"| || align="center"|G/F || align="left"|Duquesne || align="center"|4 || align="center"|– || 186 || 3,765 || 749 || 419 || 1,275 || 21.9 || 4.4 || 2.4 || 6.9 || align=center|
|-
|align="left"| || align="center"|G || align="left"|Detroit Mercy || align="center"|1 || align="center"| || 53 || 922 || 80 || 40 || 404 || 17.4 || 1.5 || 0.8 || 7.6 || align=center|
|-
|align="left"| || align="center"|F/C || align="left"|South Carolina || align="center"|1 || align="center"| || 81 || 1,603 || 397 || 63 || 660 || 19.8 || 4.9 || 0.8 || 8.1 || align=center|
|-
|align="left"| || align="center"|G || align="left"|NC State || align="center"|1 || align="center"| || 12 || 108 || 17 || 9 || 52 || 9.0 || 1.4 || 0.8 || 4.3 || align=center|
|-
|align="left" bgcolor="#FFFF99"|^ || align="center"|G || align="left"|Iona || align="center"|6 || align="center"|–– || 330 || 9,192 || 969 || 1,486 || 4,284 || 27.9 || 2.9 || 4.5 || 13.0 || align=center|
|-
|align="left"| || align="center"|F || align="left"|NC State || align="center"|1 || align="center"| || 27 || 748 || 148 || 56 || 213 || 27.7 || 5.5 || 2.1 || 7.9 || align=center|
|}

H

|-
|align="left" bgcolor="#FFFF99"|^ || align="center"|G/F || align="left"|Kentucky || align="center"|10 || align="center"|– || 745 || 21,731 || 5,116 || 2,242 || 13,447 || 29.2 || 6.9 || 3.0 || 18.0 || align=center|
|-
|align="left"| || align="center"|G/F || align="left"|Utah State || align="center"|1 || align="center"| || 1 || 4 || 0 || 0 || 0 || 4.0 || 0.0 || 0.0 || 0.0 || align=center|
|-
|align="left"| || align="center"|G || align="left"|Drake || align="center"|2 || align="center"|– || 61 || 526 || 63 || 48 || 268 || 8.6 || 1.0 || 0.8 || 4.4 || align=center|
|-
|align="left"| || align="center"|F || align="left"|Texas Tech || align="center"|1 || align="center"| || 75 || 926 || 153 || 38 || 180 || 12.3 || 2.0 || 0.5 || 2.4 || align=center|
|-
|align="left"| || align="center"|G/F || align="left"|UConn || align="center"|1 || align="center"| || 19 || 204 || 47 || 22 || 57 || 10.7 || 2.5 || 1.2 || 3.0 || align=center|
|-
|align="left"| || align="center"|F || align="left"|Arizona State || align="center"|1 || align="center"| || 25 || 141 || 29 || 8 || 76 || 5.6 || 1.2 || 0.3 || 3.0 || align=center|
|-
|align="left"| || align="center"|G/F || align="left"|Kansas || align="center"|1 || align="center"| || 14 || 86 || 13 || 7 || 34 || 6.1 || 0.9 || 0.5 || 2.4 || align=center|
|-
|align="left" bgcolor="#FFFF99"|^ || align="center"|F/C || align="left"|USC || align="center"|3 || align="center"|– || 124 || 2,568 || 589 || 262 || 698 || 20.7 || 4.8 || 2.1 || 5.6 || align=center|
|-
|align="left"| || align="center"|G || align="left"|BYU || align="center"|1 || align="center"| || 41 || 507 || 70 || 19 || 123 || 12.4 || 1.7 || 0.5 || 3.0 || align=center|
|-
|align="left"| || align="center"|G || align="left"|Michigan || align="center"|2 || align="center"|– || 130 || 3,018 || 310 || 233 || 1,469 || 23.2 || 2.4 || 1.8 || 11.3 || align=center|
|-
|align="left"| || align="center"|G/F || align="left"|Texas || align="center"|1 || align="center"| || 15 ||  || 36 || 16 || 56 ||  || 2.4 || 1.1 || 3.7 || align=center|
|-
|align="left"| || align="center"|G || align="left"|South Carolina || align="center"|1 || align="center"| || 26 || 218 || 16 || 37 || 106 || 8.4 || 0.6 || 1.4 || 4.1 || align=center|
|-
|align="left"| || align="center"|F || align="left"|St. Patrick HS (NJ) || align="center"|2 || align="center"|– || 142 || 5,332 || 984 || 446 || 2,569 || 37.5 || 6.9 || 3.1 || 18.1 || align=center|
|-
|align="left"| || align="center"|G || align="left"|Dayton || align="center"|1 || align="center"| || 15 || 168 || 18 || 18 || 41 || 11.2 || 1.2 || 1.2 || 2.7 || align=center|
|-
|align="left"| || align="center"|G || align="left"|Wisconsin || align="center"|1 || align="center"| || 58 || 1,421 || 116 || 197 || 577 || 24.5 || 2.0 || 3.4 || 9.9 || align=center|
|-
|align="left" bgcolor="#FFCC00"|+ || align="center"|G || align="left"|Michigan || align="center"|4 || align="center"|– || 168 || 5,343 || 493 || 612 || 1,568 || 31.8 || 2.9 || 3.6 || 9.3 || align=center|
|-
|align="left"| || align="center"|F/C || align="left"|Pfeiffer || align="center"|1 || align="center"| || 4 || 32 || 6 || 0 || 4 || 8.0 || 1.5 || 0.0 || 1.0 || align=center|
|-
|align="left"| || align="center"|G || align="left"|Notre Dame || align="center"|1 || align="center"| || 18 ||  ||  || 68 || 161 ||  ||  || 3.8 || 8.9 || align=center|
|-
|align="left"| || align="center"|F/C || align="left"|Arkansas || align="center"|6 || align="center"|– || 299 || 3,311 || 730 || 149 || 934 || 11.1 || 2.4 || 0.5 || 3.1 || align=center|
|-
|align="left"| || align="center"|G || align="left"|Kentucky || align="center"|1 || align="center"| || 25 ||  ||  ||  ||  ||  ||  ||  ||  || align=center|
|-
|align="left"| || align="center"|F/C || align="left"|Washington || align="center"|7 || align="center"|– || 451 || 11,814 || 3,147 || 950 || 4,498 || 26.2 || 7.0 || 2.1 || 10.0 || align=center|
|-
|align="left" bgcolor="#FFFF99"|^ || align="center"|F/C || align="left"|Iowa || align="center"|1 || align="center"| || 74 || 1,907 || 445 || 212 || 610 || 25.8 || 6.0 || 2.9 || 8.2 || align=center|
|-
|align="left"| || align="center"|G || align="left"|UCLA || align="center"|3 || align="center"|– || 244 || 8,054 || 895 || 1,549 || 3,500 || 33.0 || 3.7 || 6.3 || 14.3 || align=center|
|-
|align="left"| || align="center"|F || align="left"|Indiana || align="center"|9 || align="center"|– || 485 || 11,628 || 2,657 || 356 || 4,575 || 24.0 || 5.5 || 0.7 || 9.4 || align=center|
|-
|align="left"| || align="center"|F || align="left"|Georgia || align="center"|1 || align="center"| || 6 || 10 || 3 || 0 || 5 || 1.7 || 0.5 || 0.0 || 0.8 || align=center|
|-
|align="left"| || align="center"|G || align="left"|Hawaii || align="center"|3 || align="center"|– || 206 || 6,599 || 601 || 1,074 || 2,574 || 32.0 || 2.9 || 5.2 || 12.5 || align=center|
|-
|align="left"| || align="center"|C || align="left"|Rice || align="center"|1 || align="center"| || 19 ||  ||  || 9 || 82 ||  ||  || 0.5 || 4.3 || align=center|
|-
|align="left"| || align="center"|G || align="left"|Kansas State || align="center"|1 || align="center"| || 53 || 719 || 55 || 155 || 213 || 13.6 || 1.0 || 2.9 || 4.0 || align=center|
|-
|align="left"| || align="center"|F/C || align="left"|Minnesota || align="center"|1 || align="center"| || 48 ||  ||  || 72 || 384 ||  ||  || 1.5 || 8.0 || align=center|
|-
|align="left"| || align="center"|G/F || align="left"|Villanova || align="center"|1 || align="center"| || 14 || 81 || 10 || 3 || 40 || 5.8 || 0.7 || 0.2 || 2.9 || align=center|
|-
|align="left"| || align="center"|G || align="left"|Princeton || align="center"|6 || align="center"|– || 363 || 9,779 || 737 || 1,887 || 2,768 || 26.9 || 2.0 || 5.2 || 7.6 || align=center|
|-
|align="left"| || align="center"|G || align="left"|Winston-Salem State || align="center"|1 || align="center"| || 58 || 1,050 || 178 || 114 || 320 || 18.1 || 3.1 || 2.0 || 5.5 || align=center|
|-
|align="left"| || align="center"|G || align="left"|Kansas || align="center"|3 || align="center"|– || 83 || 1,999 || 166 || 224 || 527 || 24.1 || 2.0 || 2.7 || 6.3 || align=center|
|-
|align="left"| || align="center"|F/C || align="left"|Kansas State || align="center"|2 || align="center"|– || 72 || 2,452 || 691 || 141 || 575 || 34.1 || 9.6 || 2.0 || 8.0 || align=center|
|-
|align="left"| || align="center"|F || align="left"|Washington || align="center"|1 || align="center"| || 26 || 263 || 27 || 11 || 63 || 10.1 || 1.0 || 0.4 || 2.4 || align=center|
|-
|align="left"| || align="center"|G || align="left"|New Orleans || align="center"|1 || align="center"| || 33 || 351 || 41 || 26 || 192 || 10.6 || 1.2 || 0.8 || 5.8 || align=center|
|-
|align="left" bgcolor="#FFFF99"|^ || align="center"|G || align="left"|CCNY || align="center"|1 || align="center"| || 51 || 649 || 46 || 75 || 196 || 12.7 || 0.9 || 1.5 || 3.8 || align=center|
|-
|align="left"| || align="center"|C || align="left"|Villanova || align="center"|1 || align="center"| || 17 || 129 || 36 || 8 || 31 || 7.6 || 2.1 || 0.5 || 1.8 || align=center|
|-
|align="left" bgcolor="#FFCC00"|+ || align="center"|F/C || align="left"|Florida || align="center"|9 || align="center"|– || 578 || 19,342 || 5,144 || 1,589 || 8,288 || 33.5 || 8.9 || 2.7 || 14.3 || align=center|
|-
|align="left"| || align="center"|F || align="left"|Indiana || align="center"|1 || align="center"| || 3 || 25 || 6 || 1 || 3 || 8.3 || 2.0 || 0.3 || 1.0 || align=center|
|-
|align="left" bgcolor="#FFFF99"|^ || align="center"|F/C || align="left"|Washington || align="center"|1 || align="center"| || 11 || 166 || 46 || 9 || 64 || 15.1 || 4.2 || 0.8 || 5.8 || align=center|
|-
|align="left"| || align="center"|F || align="left"|Penn State || align="center"|1 || align="center"| || 2 || 4 || 0 || 0 || 0 || 2.0 || 0.0 || 0.0 || 0.0 || align=center|
|-
|align="left"| || align="center"|C || align="left"|SACA (GA) || align="center"|1 || align="center"| || 74 || 2,199 || 940 || 104 || 1,002 || 29.7 || 12.7 || 1.4 || 13.5 || align=center|
|-
|align="left" bgcolor="#FFCC00"|+ (#23) || align="center"|G/F || align="left"|Minnesota || align="center"|11 || align="center"|– || 730 || 25,825 || 3,598 || 2,098 || 16,049 || 35.4 || 4.9 || 2.9 || 22.0 || align=center|
|-
|align="left" bgcolor="#CCFFCC"|x || align="center"|G || align="left"|Maryland || align="center"|1 || align="center"| || 75 || 2,048 || 245 || 214 || 727 || 27.3 || 3.3 || 2.9 || 9.7 || align=center|
|-
|align="left"| || align="center"|C || align="left"|Kentucky || align="center"|1 || align="center"| || 5 || 56 || 11 || 0 || 15 || 11.2 || 2.2 || 0.0 || 3.0 || align=center|
|-
|align="left"| || align="center"|F/C || align="left"|Minnesota || align="center"|2 || align="center"|– || 77 || 984 || 277 || 42 || 391 || 12.8 || 3.6 || 0.5 || 5.1 || align=center|
|-
|align="left"| || align="center"|F || align="left"|Ohio State || align="center"|2 || align="center"|– || 23 || 125 || 36 || 1 || 33 || 5.4 || 1.6 || 0.0 || 1.4 || align=center|
|-
|align="left" bgcolor="#FFCC00"|+ || align="center"|F/C || align="left"|BYU || align="center"|2 || align="center"|– || 137 || 5,509 || 1,673 || 417 || 1,438 || 40.2 || 12.2 || 3.0 || 10.5 || align=center|
|}

I to J

|-
|align="left"| || align="center"|F || align="left"|Turkey || align="center"|2 || align="center"|– || 72 || 1,808 || 402 || 94 || 771 || 25.1 || 5.6 || 1.3 || 10.7 || align=center|
|-
|align="left"| || align="center"|G || align="left"|Villanova || align="center"|1 || align="center"| || 48 || 398 || 44 || 37 || 129 || 8.3 || 0.9 || 0.8 || 2.7 || align=center|
|-
|align="left"| || align="center"|G || align="left"|Texas || align="center"|3 || align="center"|– || 188 || 2,326 || 231 || 222 || 637 || 12.4 || 1.2 || 1.2 || 3.4 || align=center|
|-
|align="left"| || align="center"|G || align="left"|Detroit Mercy || align="center"|1 || align="center"| || 29 || 273 || 32 || 35 || 55 || 9.4 || 1.1 || 1.2 || 1.9 || align=center|
|-
|align="left"| || align="center"|G || align="left"|Ohio State || align="center"|2 || align="center"|– || 96 || 3,317 || 473 || 280 || 1,560 || 34.6 || 4.9 || 2.9 || 16.3 || align=center|
|-
|align="left"| || align="center"|G/F || align="left"|Butler CC || align="center"|1 || align="center"| || 80 || 2,940 || 370 || 244 || 1,450 || 36.8 || 4.6 || 3.1 || 18.1 || align=center|
|-
|align="left"| || align="center"|F || align="left"|St. Mary's (TX) || align="center"|1 || align="center"| || 53 || 945 || 81 || 21 || 356 || 17.8 || 1.5 || 0.4 || 6.7 || align=center|
|-
|align="left"| || align="center"|G || align="left"|Vanderbilt || align="center"|3 || align="center"|– || 98 || 1,357 || 155 || 80 || 549 || 13.8 || 1.6 || 0.8 || 5.6 || align=center|
|-
|align="left"| || align="center"|G || align="left"|College of Charleston || align="center"|5 || align="center"|–– || 181 || 3,447 || 288 || 525 || 886 || 19.0 || 1.6 || 2.9 || 4.9 || align=center|
|-
|align="left"| || align="center"|G || align="left"|La Salle || align="center"|1 || align="center"| || 6 || 43 || 8 || 0 || 21 || 7.2 || 1.3 || 0.0 || 3.5 || align=center|
|-
|align="left"| || align="center"|F || align="left"|Cincinnati || align="center"|2 || align="center"|– || 150 || 3,040 || 425 || 145 || 999 || 20.3 || 2.8 || 1.0 || 6.7 || align=center|
|-
|align="left"| || align="center"|G || align="left"|Auburn || align="center"|9 || align="center"|– || 619 || 18,852 || 1,430 || 3,207 || 9,631 || 30.5 || 2.3 || 5.2 || 15.6 || align=center|
|-
|align="left"| || align="center"|F/C || align="left"|Dillard || align="center"|1 || align="center"| || 37 || 461 || 117 || 17 || 64 || 12.5 || 3.2 || 0.5 || 1.7 || align=center|
|-
|align="left"| || align="center"|F || align="left"|Cal State San Bernardino || align="center"|2 || align="center"|– || 125 || 1,969 || 492 || 78 || 808 || 15.8 || 3.9 || 0.6 || 6.5 || align=center|
|-
|align="left" bgcolor="#FFCC00"|+ || align="center"|G/F || align="left"|Arkansas || align="center"|7 || align="center"|– || 508 || 19,733 || 2,152 || 2,653 || 10,606 || 38.8 || 4.2 || 5.2 || 20.9 || align=center|
|-
|align="left"| || align="center"|F || align="left"|Temple || align="center"|1 || align="center"| || 82 || 1,704 || 260 || 120 || 695 || 20.8 || 3.2 || 1.5 || 8.5 || align=center|
|-
|align="left"| || align="center"|G/F || align="left"|Duke || align="center"|1 || align="center"| || 28 || 381 || 31 || 20 || 88 || 13.6 || 1.1 || 0.7 || 3.1 || align=center|
|-
|align="left"| || align="center"|F/C || align="left"|Houston || align="center"|3 || align="center"|– || 215 || 5,296 || 1,675 || 321 || 2,035 || 24.6 || 7.8 || 1.5 || 9.5 || align=center|
|-
|align="left"| || align="center"|F || align="left"|South Florida || align="center"|3 || align="center"|– || 156 || 1,486 || 320 || 26 || 412 || 9.5 || 2.1 || 0.2 || 2.6 || align=center|
|-
|align="left"| || align="center"|G || align="left"|New Mexico State || align="center"|1 || align="center"| || 24 || 247 || 52 || 29 || 94 || 10.3 || 2.2 || 1.2 || 3.9 || align=center|
|-
|align="left"| || align="center"|F/C || align="left"|Whitworth || align="center"|1 || align="center"| || 73 || 1,420 || 319 || 103 || 478 || 19.5 || 4.4 || 1.4 || 6.5 || align=center|
|-
|align="left"| || align="center"|C || align="left"|Iowa || align="center"|1 || align="center"| || 22 ||  || 112 || 27 || 246 ||  || 5.1 || 1.2 || 11.2 || align=center|
|}

K to L

|-
|align="left"| || align="center"|F/C || align="left"|Guilford || align="center"|1 || align="center"| || 73 || 797 || 182 || 81 || 285 || 10.9 || 2.5 || 1.1 || 3.9 || align=center|
|-
|align="left"| || align="center"|F || align="left"|Stanford || align="center"|2 || align="center"|– || 145 || 2,312 || 633 || 114 || 815 || 15.9 || 4.4 || 0.8 || 5.6 || align=center|
|-
|align="left"| || align="center"|F || align="left"|Duke || align="center"|1 || align="center"| || 16 || 110 || 18 || 8 || 25 || 6.9 || 1.1 || 0.5 || 1.6 || align=center|
|-
|align="left"| || align="center"|F/C || align="left"|Notre Dame || align="center"|1 || align="center"| || 3 || 11 || 2 || 1 || 0 || 3.7 || 0.7 || 0.3 || 0.0 || align=center|
|-
|align="left"| || align="center"|F/C || align="left"|Loyola (IL) || align="center"|1 || align="center"| || 4 ||  ||  || 8 || 26 ||  ||  || 2.0 || 6.5 || align=center|
|-
|align="left"| || align="center"|G/F || align="left"|Illinois || align="center"|2 || align="center"| || 43 || 396 || 44 || 88 || 341 || 36.0 || 4.0 || 2.0 || 7.9 || align=center|
|-
|align="left"| || align="center"|G || align="left"|Stanford || align="center"|1 || align="center"| || 47 || 1,364 || 161 || 286 || 324 || 29.0 || 3.4 || 6.1 || 6.9 || align=center|
|-
|align="left"| || align="center"|F/C || align="left"|SMU || align="center"|10 || align="center"|– || 717 || 15,121 || 3,584 || 734 || 3,317 || 21.1 || 5.0 || 1.0 || 4.6 || align=center|
|-
|align="left" bgcolor="#FFCC00"|+ || align="center"|G/F || align="left"|Creighton || align="center"|5 || align="center"|– || 332 || 10,380 || 1,228 || 789 || 3,615 || 31.3 || 3.7 || 2.4 || 10.9 || align=center|
|-
|align="left"| || align="center"|G || align="left"|Kentucky || align="center"|1 || align="center"| || 32 || 221 || 36 || 46 || 67 || 6.9 || 1.1 || 1.4 || 2.1 || align=center|
|-
|align="left"| || align="center"|F || align="left"|Croatia || align="center"|2 || align="center"|– || 76 || 2,112 || 315 || 316 || 919 || 27.8 || 4.1 || 4.2 || 12.1 || align=center|
|-
|align="left"| || align="center"|G/F || align="left"|San Francisco || align="center"|2 || align="center"|– || 128 || 2,229 || 450 || 250 || 875 || 17.4 || 3.5 || 2.0 || 6.8 || align=center|
|-
|align="left" bgcolor="#FFCC00"|+ || align="center"|F/C || align="left"|Duke || align="center"|3 || align="center"|– || 186 || 6,399 || 1,443 || 481 || 2,931 || 34.4 || 7.8 || 2.6 || 15.8 || align=center|
|-
|align="left"| || align="center"|F/C || align="left"|Arizona State || align="center"|1 || align="center"| || 35 || 335 || 119 || 10 || 53 || 9.6 || 3.4 || 0.3 || 1.5 || align=center|
|-
|align="left"| || align="center"|C || align="left"|Arkansas || align="center"|3 || align="center"|– || 215 || 5,763 || 1,103 || 185 || 1,955 || 26.8 || 5.1 || 0.9 || 9.1 || align=center|
|-
|align="left"| || align="center"|C || align="left"|Central State || align="center"|1 || align="center"| || 35 || 180 || 43 || 12 || 111 || 5.1 || 1.2 || 0.3 || 3.2 || align=center|
|-
|align="left"| || align="center"|F/C || align="left"|Western Kentucky || align="center"|1 || align="center"| || 8 || 125 || 30 || 10 || 41 || 15.6 || 3.8 || 1.3 || 5.1 || align=center|
|-
|align="left"| || align="center"|G || align="left"|Texas A&M || align="center"|2 || align="center"|– || 111 || 1,425 || 115 || 199 || 397 || 12.8 || 1.0 || 1.8 || 3.6 || align=center|
|-
|align="left"| || align="center"|G || align="left"|Marquette || align="center"|1 || align="center"| || 49 || 997 || 59 || 169 || 376 || 20.3 || 1.2 || 3.4 || 7.7 || align=center|
|-
|align="left"| || align="center"|F/C || align="left"|Vanderbilt || align="center"|1 || align="center"| || 9 || 177 || 70 || 8 || 56 || 19.7 || 7.8 || 0.9 || 6.2 || align=center|
|-
|align="left"| || align="center"|G || align="left"|Louisville || align="center"|1 || align="center"| || 15 || 404 || 71 || 29 || 161 || 26.9 || 4.7 || 1.9 || 10.7 || align=center|
|-
|align="left"| || align="center"|G || align="left"|Oregon || align="center"|1 || align="center"| || 30 || 364 || 33 || 67 || 67 || 12.1 || 1.1 || 2.2 || 2.2 || align=center|
|-
|align="left"| || align="center"|G || align="left"|Campbell || align="center"|2 || align="center"|– || 66 || 635 || 53 || 120 || 213 || 9.6 || 0.8 || 1.8 || 3.2 || align=center|
|-
|align="left" bgcolor="#CCFFCC"|x || align="center"|C || align="left"|Maryland || align="center"|1 || align="center"| || 77 || 1,544 || 424 || 86 || 854 || 20.1 || 5.5 || 1.1 || 11.1 || align=center|
|-
|align="left"| || align="center"|C || align="left"|Missouri || align="center"|2 || align="center"|– || 9 || 22 || 7 || 1 || 12 || 2.4 || 0.8 || 0.1 || 1.3 || align=center|
|-
|align="left"| || align="center"|G || align="left"|Bradley || align="center"|1 || align="center"| || 24 || 188 || 26 || 44 || 50 || 7.8 || 1.1 || 1.8 || 2.1 || align=center|
|-
|align="left"| || align="center"|G/F || align="left"|St. John's || align="center"|1 || align="center"| || 7 || 68 || 9 || 9 || 8 || 9.7 || 1.3 || 1.3 || 1.1 || align=center|
|-
|align="left"| || align="center"|F || align="left"|Wichita State || align="center"|6 || align="center"|– || 474 || 11,835 || 2,954 || 442 || 4,205 || 25.0 || 6.2 || 0.9 || 8.9 || align=center|
|-
|align="left"| || align="center"|G || align="left"|Harvard || align="center"|1 || align="center"| || 51 || 1,003 || 119 || 181 || 546 || 19.7 || 2.3 || 3.5 || 10.7 || align=center|
|-
|align="left"| || align="center"|G || align="left"|LSU || align="center"|1 || align="center"| || 12 || 82 || 6 || 5 || 10 || 6.8 || 0.5 || 0.4 || 0.8 || align=center|
|-
|align="left"| || align="center"|F/C || align="left"|San Francisco || align="center"|1 || align="center"| || 21 || 380 || 64 || 26 || 102 || 18.1 || 3.0 || 1.2 || 4.9 || align=center|
|-
|align="left"| || align="center"|G || align="left"|Indiana || align="center"|1 || align="center"| || 30 ||  || 134 || 119 || 231 ||  || 4.5 || 4.0 || 7.7 || align=center|
|-
|align="left"| || align="center"|F || align="left"|Eastern Michigan || align="center"|3 || align="center"|– || 211 || 6,967 || 1,679 || 363 || 2,490 || 33.0 || 8.0 || 1.7 || 11.8 || align=center|
|-
|align="left"| || align="center"|G/F || align="left"|Detroit Mercy || align="center"|1 || align="center"| || 48 || 1,030 || 83 || 85 || 404 || 21.5 || 1.7 || 1.8 || 8.4 || align=center|
|-
|align="left" bgcolor="#FFFF99"|^ || align="center"|F/C || align="left"|Kansas || align="center"|4 || align="center"|– || 245 || 6,855 || 2,353 || 458 || 4,733 || 28.0 || 9.6 || 1.9 || 19.3 || align=center|
|-
|align="left"| || align="center"|G || align="left"|NC State || align="center"|1 || align="center"| || 15 || 159 || 15 || 42 || 24 || 10.6 || 1.0 || 2.8 || 1.6 || align=center|
|-
|align="left"| || align="center"|G || align="left"|Nebraska || align="center"|4 || align="center"|– || 189 || 4,814 || 336 || 681 || 2,084 || 25.5 || 1.8 || 3.6 || 11.0 || align=center|
|}

M

|-
|align="left" bgcolor="#FFFF99"|^ || align="center"|F/C || align="left"|Saint Louis || align="center"|3 || align="center"|– || 158 || 4,686 || 958 || 358 || 2,271 || 29.7 || 6.1 || 2.3 || 14.4 || align=center|
|-
|align="left"| || align="center"|G || align="left"|St. John's || align="center"|1 || align="center"| || 6 || 57 || 9 || 11 || 8 || 9.5 || 1.5 || 1.8 || 1.3 || align=center|
|-
|align="left"| || align="center"|G || align="left"|Butler || align="center"|4 || align="center"|– || 172 || 2,770 || 285 || 508 || 1,040 || 16.1 || 1.7 || 3.0 || 6.0 || align=center|
|-
|align="left"| || align="center"|G/F || align="left"|LSU || align="center"|2 || align="center"|– || 152 || 2,687 || 453 || 118 || 995 || 17.7 || 3.0 || 0.8 || 6.5 || align=center|
|-
|align="left"| || align="center"|G || align="left"|Alabama-Huntsville || align="center"|1 || align="center"| || 18 || 216 || 19 || 57 || 46 || 12.0 || 1.1 || 3.2 || 2.6 || align=center|
|-
|align="left"| || align="center"|C || align="left"|Georgetown || align="center"|1 || align="center"| || 36 ||  ||  || 64 || 223 ||  ||  || 1.8 || 6.2 || align=center|
|-
|align="left" bgcolor="#FFFF99"|^ || align="center"|F/C || align="left"|Petersburg HS (VA) || align="center"|3 || align="center"|– || 244 || 7,525 || 2,435 || 310 || 4,034 || 30.8 || 10.0 || 1.3 || 16.5 || align=center|
|-
|align="left"| || align="center"|G || align="left"|Penn || align="center"|2 || align="center"| || 69 || 1,506 || 124 || 171 || 393 || 21.8 || 1.8 || 2.5 || 5.7 || align=center|
|-
|align="left"| || align="center"|F/C || align="left"|Kansas || align="center"|1 || align="center"| || 26 || 925 || 169 || 85 || 409 || 35.6 || 6.5 || 3.3 || 15.7 || align=center|
|-
|align="left"| || align="center"|G || align="left"|Utah || align="center"|1 || align="center"| || 5 || 18 || 2 || 2 || 4 || 3.6 || 0.4 || 0.4 || 0.8 || align=center|
|-
|align="left"| || align="center"|G || align="left"|Northwestern || align="center"|1 || align="center"| || 9 || 58 || 6 || 7 || 19 || 6.4 || 0.7 || 0.8 || 2.1 || align=center|
|-
|align="left" bgcolor="#FFFF99"|^ (#44) || align="center"|G || align="left"|LSU || align="center"|4 || align="center"|– || 302 || 11,220 || 1,274 || 1,690 || 7,325 || 37.2 || 4.2 || 5.6 || 24.3 || align=center|
|-
|align="left"| || align="center"|G/F || align="left"|Iowa || align="center"|1 || align="center"| || 24 || 162 || 24 || 11 || 51 || 6.8 || 1.0 || 0.5 || 2.1 || align=center|
|-
|align="left"| || align="center"|F || align="left"|Kansas State || align="center"|1 || align="center"| || 53 || 822 || 105 || 31 || 314 || 15.5 || 2.0 || 0.6 || 5.9 || align=center|
|-
|align="left"| || align="center"|G || align="left"|Toledo || align="center"|1 || align="center"| || 7 || 47 || 10 || 6 || 12 || 6.7 || 1.4 || 0.9 || 1.7 || align=center|
|-
|align="left" bgcolor="#FFFF99"|^ || align="center"|G || align="left"|Texas || align="center"|4 || align="center"|– || 248 || 8,333 || 914 || 1,114 || 2,414 || 33.6 || 3.7 || 4.5 || 9.7 || align=center|
|-
|align="left"| || align="center"|G || align="left"|Canisius || align="center"|1 || align="center"| || 72 || 1,773 || 177 || 160 || 396 || 24.6 || 2.5 || 2.2 || 5.5 || align=center|
|-
|align="left"| || align="center"|F/C || align="left"|Temple || align="center"|1 || align="center"| || 42 || 447 || 136 || 37 || 119 || 10.6 || 3.2 || 0.9 || 2.8 || align=center|
|-
|align="left"| || align="center"|G || align="left"|Wisconsin || align="center"|5 || align="center"|– || 152 || 3,238 || 225 || 626 || 1,245 || 21.3 || 1.5 || 4.1 || 8.2 || align=center|
|-
|align="left"| || align="center"|F || align="left"|Dayton || align="center"|2 || align="center"|– || 107 || 1,602 || 284 || 76 || 738 || 15.0 || 2.7 || 0.7 || 6.9 || align=center|
|-
|align="left"| || align="center"|G || align="left"|Texas || align="center"|2 || align="center"|– || 51 || 819 || 55 || 73 || 358 || 16.1 || 1.1 || 1.4 || 7.0 || align=center|
|-
|align="left"| || align="center"|G/F || align="left"|Maryland Eastern Shore || align="center"|1 || align="center"| || 12 || 249 || 31 || 14 || 117 || 20.8 || 2.6 || 1.2 || 9.8 || align=center|
|-
|align="left"| || align="center"|G || align="left"|Canisius || align="center"|3 || align="center"|– || 169 || 5,235 || 682 || 828 || 1,331 || 31.0 || 4.0 || 4.9 || 7.9 || align=center|
|-
|align="left"| || align="center"|F/C || align="left"|Marquette || align="center"|1 || align="center"| || 11 || 70 || 22 || 5 || 11 || 6.4 || 2.0 || 0.5 || 1.0 || align=center|
|-
|align="left"| || align="center"|F || align="left"|Northwestern State || align="center"|1 || align="center"| || 11 || 106 || 20 || 8 || 14 || 9.6 || 1.8 || 0.7 || 1.3 || align=center|
|-
|align="left"| || align="center"|G || align="left"|Marshall || align="center"|1 || align="center"| || 14 || 297 || 34 || 41 || 68 || 21.2 || 2.4 || 2.9 || 4.9 || align=center|
|-
|align="left"| || align="center"|C || align="left"|Michigan || align="center"|1 || align="center"| || 56 || 689 || 165 || 32 || 252 || 12.3 || 2.9 || 0.6 || 4.5 || align=center|
|-
|align="left"| || align="center"|C || align="left"|UCLA || align="center"|1 || align="center"| || 10 || 88 || 21 || 0 || 15 || 8.8 || 2.1 || 0.0 || 1.5 || align=center|
|-
|align="left"| || align="center"|G || align="left"|Central Michigan || align="center"|3 || align="center"|– || 105 || 1,545 || 114 || 188 || 510 || 14.7 || 1.1 || 1.8 || 4.9 || align=center|
|-
|align="left"| || align="center"|G/F || align="left"|Michigan || align="center"|2 || align="center"|– || 87 || 1,537 || 175 || 162 || 839 || 17.7 || 2.0 || 1.9 || 9.6 || align=center|
|-
|align="left"| || align="center"|F/C || align="left"|Utah || align="center"|1 || align="center"| || 16 || 96 || 24 || 6 || 40 || 6.0 || 1.5 || 0.4 || 2.5 || align=center|
|-
|align="left" bgcolor="#FFFF99"|^ || align="center"|G/F || align="left"|MZCA (NC) || align="center"|1 || align="center"| || 52 || 837 || 154 || 110 || 273 || 16.1 || 3.0 || 2.1 || 5.3 || align=center|
|-
|align="left"| || align="center"|F || align="left"|Duke || align="center"|3 || align="center"|– || 112 || 2,115 || 306 || 124 || 815 || 18.9 || 2.7 || 1.1 || 7.3 || align=center|
|-
|align="left"| || align="center"|G || align="left"|St. John's || align="center"|5 || align="center"|– || 277 || 8,009 || 700 || 1,154 || 2,119 || 28.9 || 2.5 || 4.2 || 7.6 || align=center|
|-
|align="left"| || align="center"|F/C || align="left"|Maryland || align="center"|6 || align="center"|– || 416 || 8,866 || 1,816 || 492 || 3,523 || 21.3 || 4.4 || 1.2 || 8.5 || align=center|
|-
|align="left"| || align="center"|F || align="left"|Bradley || align="center"|1 || align="center"| || 48 || 1,035 || 304 || 53 || 566 || 21.6 || 6.3 || 1.1 || 11.8 || align=center|
|-
|align="left"| || align="center"|G || align="left"|Purdue || align="center"|1 || align="center"| || 1 || 14 || 0 || 0 || 2 || 14.0 || 0.0 || 0.0 || 2.0 || align=center|
|-
|align="left"| || align="center"|F || align="left"|Ukraine || align="center"|1 || align="center"| || 14 || 81 || 14 || 2 || 42 || 5.8 || 1.0 || 0.1 || 3.0 || align=center|
|-
|align="left"| || align="center"|F/C || align="left"|Tennessee || align="center"|1 || align="center"| || 65 || 2,294 || 282 || 171 || 703 || 35.3 || 4.3 || 2.6 || 10.8 || align=center|
|-
|align="left"| || align="center"|G || align="left"|Marquette || align="center"|2 || align="center"|– || 148 || 3,595 || 365 || 619 || 1,044 || 24.3 || 2.5 || 4.2 || 7.1 || align=center|
|-
|align="left"| || align="center"|F/C || align="left"|Southern Illinois || align="center"|1 || align="center"| || 74 || 2,068 || 596 || 82 || 820 || 27.9 || 8.1 || 1.1 || 11.1 || align=center|
|-
|align="left"| || align="center"|F/C || align="left"| || align="center"|1 || align="center"| || 40 || 749 || 161 || 50 || 229 || 18.7 || 4.0 || 1.3 || 5.7 || align=center|
|-
|align="left"| || align="center"|F || align="left"|Michigan State || align="center"|4 || align="center"|– || 42 || 257 || 80 || 4 || 85 || 6.1 || 1.9 || 0.1 || 2.0 || align=center|
|-
|align="left"| || align="center"|F/C || align="left"|Syracuse || align="center"|1 || align="center"| || 10 || 160 || 60 || 6 || 39 || 16.0 || 6.0 || 0.6 || 3.9 || align=center|
|-
|align="left"| || align="center"|F || align="left"|Notre Dame || align="center"|1 || align="center"| || 8 || 52 || 7 || 1 || 20 || 6.5 || 0.9 || 0.1 || 2.5 || align=center|
|-
|align="left" bgcolor="#FFCC00"|+ || align="center"|F || align="left"|Louisiana Tech || align="center"|4 || align="center"|– || 297 || 9,862 || 2,462 || 972 || 5,177 || 33.2 || 8.3 || 3.3 || 17.4 || align=center|
|-
|align="left"| || align="center"|G/F || align="left"|UCLA || align="center"|1 || align="center"| || 40 || 1,309 || 211 || 105 || 318 || 32.7 || 5.3 || 2.6 || 8.0 || align=center|
|-
|align="left"| || align="center"|C || align="left"|Kentucky || align="center"|4 || align="center"|– || 198 || 4,267 || 1,299 || 76 || 1,645 || 21.6 || 6.6 || 0.4 || 8.3 || align=center|
|-
|align="left" bgcolor="#FFFF99"|^ || align="center"|G || align="left"|Arkansas || align="center"|1 || align="center"| || 72 || 1,096 || 128 || 104 || 337 || 15.2 || 1.8 || 1.4 || 4.7 || align=center|
|-
|align="left"| || align="center"|G || align="left"|NC State || align="center"|1 || align="center"| || 38 || 313 || 33 || 27 || 131 || 8.2 || 0.9 || 0.7 || 3.4 || align=center|
|-
|align="left"| || align="center"|F || align="left"|La Salle || align="center"|1 || align="center"| ||  ||  ||  ||  ||  ||  ||  ||  ||  || align=center|
|-
|align="left"| || align="center"|F/C || align="left"|Nebraska || align="center"|1 || align="center"| || 5 || 31 || 7 || 3 || 18 || 6.2 || 1.4 || 0.6 || 3.6 || align=center|
|-
|align="left"| || align="center"|G || align="left"|Molloy || align="center"|1 || align="center"| || 6 || 98 || 16 || 7 || 28 || 16.3 || 2.7 || 1.2 || 4.7 || align=center|
|-
|align="left"| || align="center"|C || align="left"|Kentucky || align="center"|2 || align="center"|– || 51 || 213 || 58 || 4 || 80 || 4.2 || 1.1 || 0.1 || 1.6 || align=center|
|-
|align="left"| || align="center"|F/C || align="left"|Idaho || align="center"|1 || align="center"| || 13 || 79 || 26 || 0 || 21 || 6.1 || 2.0 || 0.0 || 1.6 || align=center|
|-
|align="left"| || align="center"|G || align="left"|Georgia Tech || align="center"|1 || align="center"| || 24 || 301 || 26 || 9 || 125 || 12.5 || 1.1 || 0.4 || 5.2 || align=center|
|-
|align="left"| || align="center"|C || align="left"|Utah || align="center"|2 || align="center"|– || 155 || 2,360 || 442 || 75 || 715 || 15.2 || 2.9 || 0.5 || 4.6 || align=center|
|-
|align="left"| || align="center"|G/F || align="left"|Duke || align="center"|2 || align="center"|– || 88 || 1,079 || 171 || 110 || 470 || 12.3 || 1.9 || 1.3 || 5.3 || align=center|
|-
|align="left"| || align="center"|C || align="left"|Delta State || align="center"|1 || align="center"| || 24 || 118 || 25 || 2 || 31 || 4.9 || 1.0 || 0.1 || 1.3 || align=center|
|-
|align="left"| || align="center"|G || align="left"|Shaw || align="center"|1 || align="center"| || 80 || 1,975 || 168 || 158 || 974 || 24.7 || 2.1 || 2.0 || 12.2 || align=center|
|-
|align="left"| || align="center"|F/C || align="left"|Bucknell || align="center"|5 || align="center"|– || 243 || 3,579 || 758 || 212 || 1,308 || 14.7 || 3.1 || 0.9 || 5.4 || align=center|
|-
|align="left" bgcolor="#FFFF99"|^ (#55) || align="center"|C || align="left"|Georgetown || align="center"|5 || align="center"|– || 343 || 12,419 || 4,321 || 408 || 4,095 || 36.2 || 12.6 || 1.2 || 11.9 || align=center|
|}

N to O

|-
|align="left"| || align="center"|F || align="left"|TCU || align="center"|1 || align="center"| || 27 || 300 || 63 || 17 || 142 || 11.1 || 2.3 || 0.6 || 5.3 || align=center|
|-
|align="left"| || align="center"|G || align="left"|Louisiana-Monroe || align="center"|1 || align="center"| || 5 || 15 || 0 || 2 || 13 || 3.0 || 0.0 || 0.4 || 2.6 || align=center|
|-
|align="left"| || align="center"|F/C || align="left"|UCLA || align="center"|1 || align="center"| || 19 || 438 || 167 || 22 || 195 || 23.1 || 8.8 || 1.2 || 10.3 || align=center|
|-
|align="left"| || align="center"|C || align="left"|Auburn || align="center"|1 || align="center"| || 25 || 359 || 111 || 0 || 98 || 14.4 || 4.4 || 0.0 || 3.9 || align=center|
|-
|align="left"| || align="center"|G || align="left"|Towson || align="center"|1 || align="center"| || 2 || 18 || 1 || 1 || 4 || 9.0 || 0.5 || 0.5 || 2.0 || align=center|
|-
|align="left"| || align="center"|F || align="left"|Georgia Tech || align="center"|1 || align="center"| || 72 || 850 || 204 || 24 || 100 || 11.8 || 2.8 || 0.3 || 1.4 || align=center|
|-
|align="left"| || align="center"|F || align="left"|Miami (OH) || align="center"|2 || align="center"|– || 115 || 3,204 || 493 || 144 || 902 || 27.9 || 4.3 || 1.3 || 7.8 || align=center|
|-
|align="left"| || align="center"|C || align="left"|Columbia || align="center"|1 || align="center"| || 64 || 612 || 174 || 42 || 313 || 9.6 || 2.7 || 0.7 || 4.9 || align=center|
|-
|align="left"| || align="center"|F/C || align="left"|Washington || align="center"|4 || align="center"|–– || 108 || 2,982 || 596 || 295 || 1,481 || 35.5 || 7.9 || 2.7 || 13.7 || align=center|
|-
|align="left"| || align="center"|C || align="left"|Saint Louis || align="center"|2 || align="center"|– || 39 || 424 || 125 || 12 || 122 || 10.9 || 3.2 || 0.3 || 3.1 || align=center|
|-
|align="left"| || align="center"|F || align="left"|Illinois || align="center"|3 || align="center"|– || 125 || 2,869 || 533 || 169 || 1,306 || 23.0 || 4.3 || 1.4 || 10.4 || align=center|
|-
|align="left"| || align="center"|F/C || align="left"|Wyoming || align="center"|1 || align="center"| || 1 ||  ||  || 1 || 12 ||  ||  || 1.0 || 12.0 || align=center|
|-
|align="left"| || align="center"|F || align="left"|UC Santa Barbara || align="center"|1 || align="center"| || 4 || 54 || 8 || 2 || 18 || 13.5 || 2.0 || 0.5 || 4.5 || align=center|
|-
|align="left"| || align="center"|G || align="left"|Colorado State || align="center"|1 || align="center"| || 5 || 97 || 10 || 5 || 21 || 19.4 || 2.0 || 1.0 || 4.2 || align=center|
|-
|align="left"| || align="center"|G || align="left"|Illinois || align="center"|3 || align="center"|– || 173 || 3,802 || 303 || 392 || 1,732 || 22.0 || 1.8 || 2.3 || 10.0 || align=center|
|-
|align="left"| || align="center"|G || align="left"|Georgia Tech || align="center"|1 || align="center"| || 5 || 61 || 9 || 2 || 15 || 12.2 || 1.8 || 0.4 || 3.0 || align=center|
|-
|align="left"| || align="center"|F || align="left"|Manhattan || align="center"|1 || align="center"| || 24 || 113 || 26 || 10 || 50 || 4.7 || 1.1 || 0.4 || 2.1 || align=center|
|-
|align="left"| || align="center"|F || align="left"|California || align="center"|1 || align="center"| || 4 || 50 || 9 || 3 || 12 || 12.5 || 2.3 || 0.8 || 3.0 || align=center|
|-
|align="left"| || align="center"|G || align="left"|Notre Dame || align="center"|1 || align="center"| || 43 || 1,077 || 122 || 101 || 258 || 25.0 || 2.8 || 2.3 || 6.0 || align=center|
|-
|align="left"| || align="center"|C || align="left"|Bowling Green || align="center"|3 || align="center"|– || 127 || 2,110 || 504 || 212 || 1,431 || 26.0 || 6.2 || 1.7 || 11.3 || align=center|
|-
|align="left"| || align="center"|F/C || align="left"|Bowling Green || align="center"|1 || align="center"| || 12 ||  ||  || 11 || 39 ||  ||  || 0.9 || 3.3 || align=center|
|-
|align="left"| || align="center"|G/F || align="left"|Baylor || align="center"|2 || align="center"| || 36 || 285 || 31 || 64 || 204 || 28.5 || 3.1 || 1.8 || 5.7 || align=center|
|}

P

|-
|align="left"| || align="center"|C || align="left"|Georgia || align="center"|8 || align="center"|– || 556 || 12,002 || 3,216 || 586 || 4,032 || 21.6 || 5.8 || 1.1 || 7.3 || align=center|
|-
|align="left"| || align="center"|F || align="left"|Lebanon Valley || align="center"|1 || align="center"| || 1 || 1 || 0 || 0 || 0 || 1.0 || 0.0 || 0.0 || 0.0 || align=center|
|-
|align="left"| || align="center"|G || align="left"|Arkansas || align="center"|2 || align="center"|– || 57 || 784 || 80 || 115 || 317 || 13.8 || 1.4 || 2.0 || 5.6 || align=center|
|-
|align="left"| || align="center"|G/F || align="left"|Missouri || align="center"|4 || align="center"|– || 206 || 2,885 || 516 || 238 || 964 || 14.0 || 2.5 || 1.2 || 4.7 || align=center|
|-
|align="left"| || align="center"|G/F || align="left"|Pittsburgh || align="center"|2 || align="center"|– || 40 || 435 || 57 || 45 || 93 || 10.9 || 1.4 || 1.1 || 2.3 || align=center|
|-
|align="left"| || align="center"|G || align="left"|UConn || align="center"|1 || align="center"| || 4 || 13 || 2 || 2 || 7 || 3.3 || 0.5 || 0.5 || 1.8 || align=center|
|-
|align="left"| || align="center"|F/C || align="left"|St. John's || align="center"|1 || align="center"| || 40 || 486 || 113 || 18 || 89 || 12.2 || 2.8 || 0.5 || 2.2 || align=center|
|-
|align="left"| || align="center"|G/F || align="left"|Bowling Green || align="center"|1 || align="center"| || 68 || 1,470 || 114 || 140 || 436 || 21.6 || 1.7 || 2.1 || 6.4 || align=center|
|-
|align="left"| || align="center"|F/C || align="left"|Michigan State || align="center"|1 || align="center"| || 3 || 19 || 4 || 0 || 5 || 6.3 || 1.3 || 0.0 || 1.7 || align=center|
|-
|align="left"| || align="center"|C || align="left"|Kentucky || align="center"|1 || align="center"| || 29 || 227 || 69 || 15 || 119 || 7.8 || 2.4 || 0.5 || 4.1 || align=center|
|-
|align="left"| || align="center"|F/C || align="left"|Buffalo || align="center"|4 || align="center"|– || 192 || 2,891 || 677 || 95 || 855 || 15.1 || 3.5 || 0.5 || 4.5 || align=center|
|-
|align="left"| || align="center"|G/F || align="left"|Tulane || align="center"|2 || align="center"|– || 126 ||  || 319 || 257 || 767 ||  || 4.8 || 2.0 || 6.1 || align=center|
|-
|align="left"| || align="center"|G || align="left"|Auburn || align="center"|1 || align="center"| || 9 || 132 || 25 || 5 || 40 || 14.7 || 2.8 || 0.6 || 4.4 || align=center|
|-
|align="left"| || align="center"|F || align="left"|Oregon || align="center"|1 || align="center"| || 4 || 24 || 10 || 3 || 8 || 6.0 || 2.5 || 0.8 || 2.0 || align=center|
|-
|align="left"| || align="center"|C || align="left"|Cornell || align="center"|1 || align="center"| || 36 ||  || 250 || 58 || 279 ||  || 6.9 || 1.6 || 7.8 || align=center|
|-
|align="left"| || align="center"|C || align="left"|France || align="center"|1 || align="center"| || 31 || 352 || 112 || 16 || 108 || 11.4 || 3.6 || 0.5 || 3.5 || align=center|
|-
|align="left" bgcolor="#FFFF99"|^ (#9) || align="center"|F/C || align="left"|LSU || align="center"|11 || align="center"|– || 792 || 30,690 || bgcolor="#CFECEC"|12,849 || 2,369 || 20,880 || 38.8 || bgcolor="#CFECEC"|16.2 || 3.0 || bgcolor="#CFECEC"|26.4 || align=center|
|-
|align="left"| || align="center"|F || align="left"|Villanova || align="center"|1 || align="center"| || 7 || 65 || 10 || 3 || 20 || 9.3 || 1.4 || 0.4 || 2.9 || align=center|
|-
|align="left"| || align="center"|F/C || align="left"|Xavier || align="center"|2 || align="center"|– || 54 || 976 || 188 || 53 || 305 || 18.1 || 3.5 || 1.0 || 5.6 || align=center|
|-
|align="left"| || align="center"|C || align="left"|Texas || align="center"|1 || align="center"| || 2 || 3 || 3 || 0 || 0 || 1.5 || 1.5 || 0.0 || 0.0 || align=center|
|-
|align="left"| || align="center"|F/C || align="left"|Duke || align="center"|2 || align="center"|– || 73 || 1,091 || 267 || 62 || 317 || 14.9 || 3.7 || 0.8 || 4.3 || align=center|
|-
|align="left"| || align="center"|F || align="left"|NC State || align="center"|1 || align="center"| || 54 || 653 || 135 || 22 || 224 || 12.1 || 2.5 || 0.4 || 4.1 || align=center|
|-
|align="left"| || align="center"|F || align="left"|Kentucky || align="center"|1 || align="center"| || 21 || 305 || 76 || 17 || 107 || 14.5 || 3.6 || 0.8 || 5.1 || align=center|
|-
|align="left"| || align="center"|F || align="left"|Baylor || align="center"|3 || align="center"|– || 196 || 4,997 || 745 || 387 || 2,235 || 25.5 || 3.8 || 2.0 || 11.4 || align=center|
|-
|align="left"| || align="center"|C || align="left"|Minnesota || align="center"|1 || align="center"| || 12 || 314 || 101 || 4 || 48 || 26.2 || 8.4 || 0.3 || 4.0 || align=center|
|}

R

|-
|align="left"| || align="center"|F || align="left"|Serbia || align="center"|1 || align="center"| || 49 || 755 || 143 || 54 || 220 || 15.4 || 2.9 || 1.1 || 4.5 || align=center|
|-
|align="left"| || align="center"|F || align="left"|NYU || align="center"|1 || align="center"| || 4 || 35 || 19 || 0 || 17 || 8.8 || 4.8 || 0.0 || 4.3 || align=center|
|-
|align="left"| || align="center"|C || align="left"|Oregon || align="center"|2 || align="center"|– || 103 || 2,251 || 448 || 112 || 800 || 21.9 || 4.3 || 1.1 || 7.8 || align=center|
|-
|align="left"| || align="center"|F/C || align="left"|Lindblom Academy (IL) || align="center"|3 || align="center"|– || 139 || 4,310 || 1,010 || 366 || 1,213 || 31.0 || 7.3 || 2.6 || 8.7 || align=center|
|-
|align="left"| || align="center"|F/C || align="left"|Wyoming || align="center"|3 || align="center"|– || 137 || 4,248 || 1,004 || 125 || 1,170 || 31.0 || 7.3 || 0.9 || 8.5 || align=center|
|-
|align="left"| || align="center"|F || align="left"|Syracuse || align="center"|1 || align="center"| || 4 || 12 || 2 || 3 || 0 || 3.0 || 0.5 || 0.8 || 0.0 || align=center|
|-
|align="left"| || align="center"|F/C || align="left"|Western Kentucky || align="center"|1 || align="center"| || 61 ||  ||  || 60 || 364 ||  ||  || 1.0 || 6.0 || align=center|
|-
|align="left"| || align="center"|C || align="left"|Serbia || align="center"|1 || align="center"| || 3 || 51 || 9 || 2 || 25 || 17.0 || 3.0 || 0.7 || 8.3 || align=center|
|-
|align="left"| || align="center"|G || align="left"|Washington || align="center"|2 || align="center"|– || 130 || 2,661 || 257 || 211 || 953 || 20.5 || 2.0 || 1.6 || 7.3 || align=center|
|-
|align="left"| || align="center"|F/C || align="left"|Oklahoma City || align="center"|2 || align="center"|– || 67 || 967 || 319 || 32 || 327 || 14.4 || 4.8 || 0.5 || 4.9 || align=center|
|-
|align="left"| || align="center"|F || align="left"|Wisconsin || align="center"|1 || align="center"| || 29 || 594 || 174 || 38 || 207 || 20.5 || 6.0 || 1.3 || 7.1 || align=center|
|-
|align="left"| || align="center"|G || align="left"|Drake || align="center"|1 || align="center"| || 6 || 54 || 9 || 1 || 11 || 9.0 || 1.5 || 0.2 || 1.8 || align=center|
|-
|align="left"| || align="center"|G/F || align="left"|Delta State || align="center"|2 || align="center"|– || 24 || 107 || 9 || 0 || 39 || 4.5 || 0.4 || 0.0 || 1.6 || align=center|
|-
|align="left"| || align="center"|F/C || align="left"|Duquesne || align="center"|1 || align="center"| || 29 || 777 || 196 || 82 || 243 || 26.8 || 6.8 || 2.8 || 8.4 || align=center|
|-
|align="left"| || align="center"|G || align="left"|UNLV || align="center"|1 || align="center"| || 60 || 2,084 || 258 || 219 || 1,158 || 34.7 || 4.3 || 3.7 || 19.3 || align=center|
|-
|align="left"| || align="center"|F || align="left"|Mount St. Mary's || align="center"|1 || align="center"| || 7 || 39 || 12 || 1 || 13 || 5.6 || 1.7 || 0.1 || 1.9 || align=center|
|-
|align="left" bgcolor="#FFCC00"|+ || align="center"|G || align="left"|Marquette || align="center"|8 || align="center"|– || 568 || 17,301 || 2,000 || bgcolor="#CFECEC"|3,866 || 7,357 || 30.5 || 3.5 || 6.8 || 13.0 || align=center|
|-
|align="left"| || align="center"|G || align="left"|West Virginia || align="center"|1 || align="center"| || 63 || 929 || 70 || 103 || 373 || 14.7 || 1.1 || 1.6 || 5.9 || align=center|
|-
|align="left"| || align="center"|F || align="left"|Purdue || align="center"|1 || align="center"| || 69 || 2,591 || 457 || 205 || 1,436 || 37.6 || 6.6 || 3.0 || 20.8 || align=center|
|-
|align="left"| || align="center"|G/F || align="left"|Centenary || align="center"|1 || align="center"| || 33 || 631 || 87 || 36 || 199 || 19.1 || 2.6 || 1.1 || 6.0 || align=center|
|-
|align="left"| || align="center"|G || align="left"|Michigan || align="center"|2 || align="center"|– || 128 || 2,894 || 290 || 578 || 1,320 || 22.6 || 2.3 || 4.5 || 10.3 || align=center|
|-
|align="left"| || align="center"|F/C || align="left"|Tennessee State || align="center"|1 || align="center"| || 36 || 1,449 || 462 || 97 || 806 || 40.3 || 12.8 || 2.7 || 22.4 || align=center|
|-
|align="left"| || align="center"|G || align="left"|NC State || align="center"|1 || align="center"| || 2 || 7 || 0 || 1 || 0 || 3.5 || 0.0 || 0.5 || 0.0 || align=center|
|-
|align="left"| || align="center"|G || align="left"|Louisville || align="center"|1 || align="center"| || 7 || 71 || 3 || 11 || 18 || 10.1 || 0.4 || 1.6 || 2.6 || align=center|
|-
|align="left"| || align="center"|C || align="left"|Clemson || align="center"|11 || align="center"|– || 814 || 20,763 || 5,994 || 570 || 5,666 || 25.5 || 7.4 || 0.7 || 7.0 || align=center|
|-
|align="left"| || align="center"|C || align="left"|Arizona || align="center"|1 || align="center"| || 16 || 215 || 51 || 9 || 93 || 13.4 || 3.2 || 0.6 || 5.8 || align=center|
|-
|align="left" bgcolor="#FFCC00"|+ || align="center"|F/C || align="left"|Central Michigan || align="center"|6 || align="center"|– || 435 || 14,893 || 4,658 || 1,047 || 7,644 || 34.2 || 10.7 || 2.4 || 17.6 || align=center|
|-
|align="left"| || align="center"|G || align="left"|Western Michigan || align="center"|1 || align="center"| || 21 || 377 || 40 || 66 || 83 || 18.0 || 1.9 || 3.1 || 4.0 || align=center|
|}

S

|-
|align="left"| || align="center"|G || align="left"|Temple || align="center"|1 || align="center"| || 5 || 34 || 1 || 5 || 0 || 6.8 || 0.2 || 1.0 || 0.0 || align=center|
|-
|align="left"| || align="center"|F || align="left"|Georgia Southern || align="center"|2 || align="center"|– || 21 || 237 || 55 || 15 || 71 || 11.3 || 2.6 || 0.7 || 3.4 || align=center|
|-
|align="left"| || align="center"|G/F || align="left"|Seton Hall || align="center"|1 || align="center"| || 65 || 1,139 || 134 || 104 || 287 || 17.5 || 2.1 || 1.6 || 4.4 || align=center|
|-
|align="left"| || align="center"|F/C || align="left"|Texas Southern || align="center"|3 || align="center"|– || 106 || 1,861 || 571 || 86 || 658 || 20.2 || 6.2 || 0.9 || 6.2 || align=center|
|-
|align="left"| || align="center"|G || align="left"|Villanova || align="center"|1 || align="center"| || 42 || 496 || 58 || 44 || 193 || 11.8 || 1.4 || 1.0 || 4.6 || align=center|
|-
|align="left"| || align="center"|C || align="left"|LIU Brooklyn || align="center"|1 || align="center"| || 20 ||  || 50 || 17 || 68 ||  || 2.5 || 0.9 || 3.4 || align=center|
|-
|align="left"| || align="center"|C || align="left"|Colorado State || align="center"|1 || align="center"| || 57 || 547 || 155 || 45 || 164 || 9.6 || 2.7 || 0.8 || 2.9 || align=center|
|-
|align="left"| || align="center"|G || align="left"|Germany || align="center"|5 || align="center"|– || 352 || 8,341 || 884 || 1,675 || 4,545 || 23.7 || 2.5 || 4.8 || 12.9 || align=center|
|-
|align="left"| || align="center"|G/F || align="left"|Wisconsin || align="center"|1 || align="center"| || 8 ||  ||  || 8 || 41 ||  ||  || 1.0 || 5.1 || align=center|
|-
|align="left"| || align="center"|F || align="left"|Virginia || align="center"|5 || align="center"|– || 281 || 4,322 || 836 || 257 || 1,988 || 15.4 || 3.0 || 0.9 || 7.1 || align=center|
|-
|align="left"| || align="center"|G/F || align="left"|Switzerland || align="center"|3 || align="center"|– || 189 || 4,330 || 827 || 289 || 1,202 || 22.9 || 4.4 || 1.5 || 6.4 || align=center|
|-
|align="left" bgcolor="#FFCC00"|+ || align="center"|G/F || align="left"|Furman || align="center"|3 || align="center"|– || 43 || 639 || 107 || 51 || 246 || 14.9 || 2.5 || 1.2 || 5.7 || align=center|
|-
|align="left"| || align="center"|C || align="left"|Bowling Green || align="center"|7 || align="center"|– || 442 || 10,291 || 3,999 || 597 || 4,119 || 25.5 || 9.9 || 1.5 || 9.3 || align=center|
|-
|align="left"| || align="center"|F || align="left"|Georgetown || align="center"|2 || align="center"|– || 59 || 607 || 141 || 27 || 240 || 10.3 || 2.4 || 0.5 || 4.1 || align=center|
|-
|align="left"| || align="center"|G || align="left"|Kentucky || align="center"|1 || align="center"| || 18 || 185 || 22 || 16 || 40 || 10.3 || 1.2 || 0.9 || 2.2 || align=center|
|-
|align="left"| || align="center"|F/C || align="left"|Iowa State || align="center"|1 || align="center"| || 2 || 5 || 1 || 0 || 0 || 2.5 || 0.5 || 0.0 || 0.0 || align=center|
|-
|align="left"| || align="center"|G || align="left"|Dayton || align="center"|1 || align="center"| || 1 || 4 || 0 || 0 || 3 || 4.0 || 0.0 || 0.0 || 3.0 || align=center|
|-
|align="left"| || align="center"|F || align="left"|Ohio State || align="center"|1 || align="center"| || 21 || 335 || 32 || 52 || 70 || 16.0 || 1.5 || 2.5 || 3.3 || align=center|
|-
|align="left"| || align="center"|F/C || align="left"|Creighton || align="center"|5 || align="center"|– || 363 || 7,904 || 3,184 || 446 || 2,848 || 21.8 || 8.8 || 1.2 || 7.8 || align=center|
|-
|align="left"| || align="center"|F || align="left"|Providence || align="center"|1 || align="center"| || 1 || 3 || 0 || 1 || 0 || 3.0 || 0.0 || 1.0 || 0.0 || align=center|
|-
|align="left"| || align="center"|G/F || align="left"|Pepperdine || align="center"|1 || align="center"| || 46 || 1,174 || 156 || 142 || 446 || 25.5 || 3.4 || 3.1 || 9.7 || align=center|
|-
|align="left"| || align="center"|F || align="left"|Wyoming || align="center"|1 || align="center"| || 4 || 37 || 7 || 1 || 16 || 9.3 || 1.8 || 0.3 || 4.0 || align=center|
|-
|align="left"| || align="center"|G || align="left"|Texas A&M || align="center"|1 || align="center"| || 5 || 20 || 5 || 5 || 6 || 4.0 || 1.0 || 1.0 || 1.2 || align=center|
|-
|align="left"| || align="center"|G/F || align="left"|Southeastern Illinois || align="center"|2 || align="center"|– || 61 || 560 || 66 || 48 || 165 || 9.2 || 1.1 || 0.8 || 2.7 || align=center|
|-
|align="left"| || align="center"|F || align="left"|Maryland || align="center"|1 || align="center"| || 64 || 592 || 157 || 21 || 194 || 9.3 || 2.5 || 0.3 || 3.0 || align=center|
|-
|align="left"| || align="center"|F || align="left"|Oak Hill Academy (VA) || align="center"|9 || align="center"|– || 676 || 23,078 || 5,407 || 2,170 || 10,371 || 34.1 || 8.0 || 3.2 || 15.3 || align=center|
|-
|align="left"| || align="center"|G || align="left"|North Carolina || align="center"|1 || align="center"| || 33 || 674 || 37 || 142 || 255 || 20.4 || 1.1 || 4.3 || 7.7 || align=center|
|-
|align="left"| || align="center"|C || align="left"|King College Prep (IL) || align="center"|1 || align="center"| || 14 || 100 || 31 || 3 || 31 || 7.1 || 2.2 || 0.2 || 2.2 || align=center|
|-
|align="left"| || align="center"|G/F || align="left"|Buffalo State || align="center"|1 || align="center"| || 15 || 142 || 8 || 14 || 71 || 9.5 || 0.5 || 0.9 || 4.7 || align=center|
|-
|align="left" bgcolor="#FFCC00"|+ || align="center"|G || align="left"|Michigan State || align="center"|5 || align="center"|– || 339 || 12,448 || 1,294 || 1,206 || 6,291 || 36.7 || 3.8 || 3.6 || 18.6 || align=center|
|-
|align="left"| || align="center"|G || align="left"|Marquette || align="center"|1 || align="center"| || 6 || 78 || 3 || 10 || 17 || 13.0 || 0.5 || 1.7 || 2.8 || align=center|
|-
|align="left"| || align="center"|G/F || align="left"|Davidson || align="center"|2 || align="center"|– || 130 || 2,298 || 285 || 223 || 977 || 17.7 || 2.2 || 1.7 || 7.5 || align=center|
|-
|align="left"| || align="center"|F/C || align="left"|Utah || align="center"|3 || align="center"|– || 191 || 4,282 || 1,237 || 172 || 1,658 || 22.4 || 6.5 || 0.9 || 8.7 || align=center|
|-
|align="left"| || align="center"|G || align="left"|Villanova || align="center"|2 || align="center"|– || 131 || 4,158 || 365 || 662 || 1,472 || 31.7 || 2.8 || 5.1 || 11.2 || align=center|
|-
|align="left"| || align="center"|G || align="left"|Western Kentucky || align="center"|1 || align="center"| || 7 || 97 || 12 || 6 || 35 || 13.9 || 1.7 || 0.9  || 5 || align=center|
|-
|align="left"| || align="center"|F || align="left"|Villanova || align="center"|1 || align="center"| || 46 || 805 || 194 || 47 || 272 || 17.5 || 4.2 || 1.0 || 5.9 || align=center|
|-
|align="left"| || align="center"|F || align="left"|Northern Arizona || align="center"|1 || align="center"| || 3 || 15 || 1 || 0 || 0 || 5.0 || 0.3 || 0.0 || 0.0 || align=center|
|-
|align="left"| || align="center"|F/C || align="left"|Brazil || align="center"|1 || align="center"| || 36 || 579 || 120 || 30 || 201 || 16.1 || 3.3 || 0.8 || 5.6 || align=center|
|-
|align="left"| || align="center"|G/F || align="left"|North Carolina || align="center"|1 || align="center"| || 30 || 273 || 23 || 14 || 108 || 9.1 || 0.8 || 0.5 || 3.6 || align=center|
|-
|align="left"| || align="center"|G/F || align="left"|Notre Dame || align="center"|1 || align="center"| || 72 || 2,219 || 377 || 207 || 743 || 30.8 || 5.2 || 2.9 || 10.3 || align=center|
|-
|align="left"| || align="center"|G || align="left"|Washington Union HS (CA) || align="center"|1 || align="center"| || 56 || 1,158 || 122 || 52 || 284 || 20.7 || 2.2 || 0.9 || 5.1 || align=center|
|-
|align="left"| || align="center"|C || align="left"|California || align="center"|1 || align="center"| || 12 || 145 || 40 || 5 || 25 || 12.1 || 3.3 || 0.4 || 2.1 || align=center|
|-
|align="left"| || align="center"|F || align="left"|Missouri || align="center"|1 || align="center"| || 5 || 37 || 5 || 2 || 10 || 7.4 || 1.0 || 0.4 || 2.0 || align=center|
|-
|align="left"| || align="center"|F || align="left"|Colorado || align="center"|1 || align="center"| || 5 || 15 || 5 || 0 || 8 || 3.0 || 1.0 || 0.0 || 1.6 || align=center|
|-
|align="left"| || align="center"|G || align="left"|Arizona || align="center"|3 || align="center"|– || 157 || 2,672 || 214 || 164 || 1,260 || 17.0 || 1.4 || 1.0 || 8.0 || align=center|
|-
|align="left"| || align="center"|F || align="left"|Temple || align="center"|1 || align="center"| || 46 || 654 || 131 || 20 || 208 || 14.2 || 2.8 || 0.4 || 4.5 || align=center|
|-
|align="left" bgcolor="#FFCC00"|+ || align="center"|G || align="left"|Illinois || align="center"|1 || align="center"| || 68 || 2,232 || 225 || 187 || 760 || 32.8 || 3.3 || 2.8 || 11.2 || align=center|
|-
|align="left"| || align="center"|G || align="left"|Florida State || align="center"|1 || align="center"| || 27 || 956 || 223 || 144 || 397 || 35.4 || 8.3 || 5.3 || 14.7 || align=center|
|-
|align="left"| || align="center"|F || align="left"|LIU Brooklyn || align="center"|1 || align="center"| || 32 || 358 || 69 || 23 || 133 || 11.2 || 2.2 || 0.7 || 4.2 || align=center|
|-
|align="left"| || align="center"|F || align="left"|France || align="center"|1 || align="center"| || 3 || 21 || 3 || 2 || 7 || 7.0 || 1.0 || 0.7 || 2.3 || align=center|
|}

T

|-
|align="left"| || align="center"|C || align="left"|Cape Verde || align="center"|2 || align="center"|– || 12 || 77 || 22 || 3 || 27 || 6.4 || 1.8 || 0.3 || 2.3 || align=center|
|-
|align="left"| || align="center"|G || align="left"|Texas || align="center"|1 || align="center"| || 67 || 1,167 || 94 || 206 || 445 || 17.4 || 1.4 || 3.1 || 6.6 || align=center|
|-
|align="left" bgcolor="#FFCC00"|+ || align="center"|G || align="left"|Wake Forest || align="center"|7 || align="center"|– || 518 || 13,518 || 1,114 || 2,671 || 6,291 || 26.1 || 2.2 || 5.2 || 12.1 || align=center|
|-
|align="left"| || align="center"|G/F || align="left"|Stanford || align="center"|2 || align="center"|– || 39 || 407 || 33 || 32 || 171 || 10.4 || 0.8 || 0.8 || 4.4 || align=center|
|-
|align="left"| || align="center"|G || align="left"|Arizona || align="center"|5 || align="center"|– || 403 || 14,043 || 1,320 || 2,230 || 6,534 || 34.8 || 3.3 || 5.5 || 16.2 || align=center|
|-
|align="left"| || align="center"|G || align="left"|UNLV || align="center"|1 || align="center"| || 82 || 2,517 || 242 || 387 || 1,296 || 30.7 || 3.0 || 4.7 || 15.8 || align=center|
|-
|align="left"| || align="center"|F || align="left"|Syracuse || align="center"|1 || align="center"| || 13 || 82 || 23 || 2 || 32 || 6.3 || 1.8 || 0.2 || 2.5 || align=center|
|-
|align="left"| || align="center"|F || align="left"|Texas || align="center"|1 || align="center"| || 2 || 5 || 2 || 0 || 2 || 2.5 || 1.0 || 0.0 || 1.0 || align=center|
|-
|align="left"| || align="center"|F || align="left"|Minnesota || align="center"|1 || align="center"| || 11 || 66 || 10 || 1 || 9 || 6.0 || 0.9 || 0.1 || 0.8 || align=center|
|-
|align="left"| || align="center"|G/F || align="left"|UCLA || align="center"|1 || align="center"| || 6 || 50 || 8 || 2 || 17 || 8.3 || 1.3 || 0.3 || 2.8 || align=center|
|-
|align="left" bgcolor="#FFFF99"|^ || align="center"|G || align="left"|West Virginia || align="center"|2 || align="center"|– || 113 || 2,090 || 269 || 199 || 995 || 18.5 || 2.4 || 1.8 || 8.8 || align=center|
|-
|align="left"| || align="center"|F/C || align="left"|Wyoming || align="center"|2 || align="center"|– || 117 ||  || 455 || 367 || 1,348 ||  || 6.9 || 3.1 || 11.5 || align=center|
|-
|align="left"| || align="center"|F || align="left"|Indiana || align="center"|1 || align="center"| || 50 || 341 || 88 || 16 || 103 || 6.8 || 1.8 || 0.3 || 2.1 || align=center|
|-
|align="left"| || align="center"|F/C || align="left"|Creighton || align="center"|1 || align="center"| || 62 || 963 || 155 || 32 || 253 || 15.5 || 2.5 || 0.5 || 4.1 || align=center|
|-
|align="left"| || align="center"|G || align="left"|Dayton || align="center"|2 || align="center"| || 35 || 310 || 16 || 52 || 93 || 8.9 || 0.5 || 1.5 || 2.7 || align=center|
|-
|align="left"| || align="center"|F/C || align="left"|Tennessee || align="center"|6 || align="center"|–– || 271 || 3,223 || 1,122 || 257 || 1,191 || 11.9 || 4.1 || 0.9 || 4.4 || align=center|
|-
|align="left"| || align="center"|G || align="left"|Indiana || align="center"|1 || align="center"| || 71 || 1,825 || 163 || 196 || 492 || 25.7 || 2.3 || 2.8 || 6.9 || align=center|
|-
|align="left"| || align="center"|F/C || align="left"|Long Beach State || align="center"|2 || align="center"|– || 137 || 2,743 || 638 || 178 || 1,261 || 20.0 || 4.7 || 1.3 || 9.2 || align=center|
|-
|align="left"| || align="center"|F/C || align="left"|Seattle || align="center"|2 || align="center"|– || 19 || 248 || 103 || 16 || 115 || 13.1 || 5.4 || 0.8 || 6.1 || align=center|
|-
|align="left"| || align="center"|F || align="left"|UC Santa Barbara || align="center"|2 || align="center"|– || 74 || 593 || 97 || 39 || 158 || 8.0 || 1.3 || 0.5 || 2.1 || align=center|
|-
|align="left"| || align="center"|C || align="left"|San Diego HS (CA) || align="center"|1 || align="center"| || 1 || 5 || 3 || 0 || 0 || 5.0 || 3.0 || 0.0 || 0.0 || align=center|
|}

V to Z
––

|-
|align="left"| || align="center"|G || align="left"|UCLA || align="center"|2 || align="center"|– || 60 || 540 || 45 || 56 || 244 || 9.0 || 0.8 || 0.9 || 4.1 || align=center|
|-
|align="left"| || align="center"|G/F || align="left"|Indiana || align="center"|2 || align="center"|– || 148 || 4,596 || 435 || 353 || 2,200 || 31.1 || 2.9 || 2.4 || 14.9 || align=center|
|-
|align="left"| || align="center"|G/F || align="left"|Illinois || align="center"|3 || align="center"|– || 71 || 118 || 109 || 187 || 468 || 16.9 || 3.0 || 2.6 || 6.6 || align=center|
|-
|align="left"| || align="center"|G || align="left"|Southern Illinois || align="center"|4 || align="center"|– || 239 || 5,595 || 603 || 574 || 2,421 || 23.4 || 2.5 || 2.4 || 10.1 || align=center|
|-
|align="left"| || align="center"|G || align="left"|Kansas || align="center"|2 || align="center"| || 153 || 3,127 || 284 || 544 || 810 || 20.4 || 1.9 || 3.6 || 5.3 || align=center|
|-
|align="left"| || align="center"|G || align="left"|Georgia Tech || align="center"|1 || align="center"| || 5 || 27 || 0 || 1 || 4 || 5.4 || 0.0 || 0.2 || 0.8 || align=center|
|-
|align="left"| || align="center"|C || align="left"|Soviet Union || align="center"|2 || align="center"| || 149 || 2,453 || 384 || 333 || 1,019 || 16.5 || 2.6 || 2.2 || 6.8 || align=center|
|-
|align="left"| || align="center"|G/F || align="left"|Penn State || align="center"|1 || align="center"| || 26 ||  ||  || 36 || 109 ||  ||  || 1.4 || 4.2 || align=center|
|-
|align="left"| || align="center"|F || align="left"|Kentucky || align="center"|1 || align="center"| || 53 || 2,128 || 497 || 194 || 1,082 || 40.2 || 9.4 || 3.7 || 20.4 || align=center|
|-
|align="left"| || align="center"|F/C || align="left"|North Carolina || align="center"|1 || align="center"| || 1 || 42 || 6 || 2 || 20 || bgcolor="#CFECEC"|42.0 || 6.0 || 2.0 || 20.0 || align=center|
|-
|align="left"| || align="center"|F || align="left"|Tennessee State || align="center"|1 || align="center"| || 11 || 29 || 10 || 1 || 7 || 2.6 || 0.9 || 0.1 || 0.6 || align=center|
|-
|align="left"| || align="center"|G || align="left"|Benjamin Franklin HS (NY) || align="center"|1 || align="center"| || 4 || 30 || 1 || 2 || 2 || 7.5 || 0.3 || 0.5 || 0.5 || align=center|
|-
|align="left"| || align="center"|G || align="left"|Boston College || align="center"|1 || align="center"| || 24 || 139 || 21 || 21 || 43 || 5.8 || 0.9 || 0.9 || 1.8 || align=center|
|-
|align="left"| || align="center"|C || align="left"|NC State || align="center"|1 || align="center"| || 29 || 174 || 55 || 3 || 57 || 6.0 || 1.9 || 0.1 || 2.0 || align=center|
|-
|align="left"| || align="center"|F/C || align="left"|Villanova || align="center"|5 || align="center"|– || 318 || 9,777 || 2,683 || 562 || 3,011 || 30.7 || 8.4 || 1.8 || 9.5 || align=center|
|-
|align="left"| || align="center"|G || align="left"|Kentucky || align="center"|1 || align="center"| ||  ||  ||  ||  ||  ||  ||  ||  ||  || align=center|
|-
|align="left"| || align="center"|G || align="left"|NC State || align="center"|7 || align="center"|– || 483 || 9,525 || 887 || 2,159 || 3,702 || 19.7 || 1.8 || 4.5 || 7.7 || align=center|
|-
|align="left"| || align="center"|G || align="left"|Georgia Tech || align="center"|3 || align="center"|– || 156 || 680 || 131 || 41 || 132 || 4.4 || 0.8 || 0.3 || 0.8 || align=center|
|-
|align="left"| || align="center"|F/C || align="left"|Old Dominion || align="center"|1 || align="center"| || 49 || 499 || 125 || 13 || 60 || 10.2 || 2.6 || 0.3 || 1.2 || align=center|
|-
|align="left"| || align="center"|G/F || align="left"|Virginia Tech || align="center"|3 || align="center"|– || 161 || 2,521 || 342 || 254 || 595 || 15.7 || 2.1 || 1.6 || 3.7 || align=center|
|-
|align="left"| || align="center"|G || align="left"|Alabama || align="center"|3 || align="center"|– || 114 || 1,320 || 133 || 237 || 373 || 11.6 || 1.2 || 2.1 || 3.3 || align=center|
|-
|align="left"| || align="center"|G || align="left"|Syracuse || align="center"|1 || align="center"| || 15 || 209 || 34 || 6 || 69 || 13.9 || 2.3 || 0.4 || 4.6 || align=center|
|-
|align="left"| || align="center"|G || align="left"|Georgia || align="center"|1 || align="center"| || 38 || 315 || 48 || 47 || 90 || 8.3 || 1.3 || 1.2 || 2.4 || align=center|
|-
|align="left"| || align="center"|G || align="left"|Northern Illinois || align="center"|1 || align="center"| || 3 || 16 || 1 || 1 || 2 || 5.3 || 0.3 || 0.3 || 0.7 || align=center|
|-
|align="left"| || align="center"|G || align="left"|Iowa || align="center"|1 || align="center"| || 56 ||  ||  || 107 || 429 ||  ||  || 1.9 || 7.7 || align=center|
|-
|align="left"| || align="center"|G || align="left"|Long Beach State || align="center"|3 || align="center"|– || 71 || 1,138 || 112 || 253 || 256 || 16.0 || 1.6 || 3.6 || 3.6 || align=center|
|-
|align="left"| || align="center"|G/F || align="left"|Memphis || align="center"|2 || align="center"|– || 134 || 2,101 || 411 || 213 || 815 || 15.7 || 3.1 || 1.6 || 6.1 || align=center|
|-
|align="left" bgcolor="#FFFF99"|^ || align="center"|G || align="left"|Providence || align="center"|8 || align="center"|– || 555 || 19,552 || 2,741 || 3,049 || 8,591 || 35.2 || 4.9 || 5.5 || 15.5 || align=center|
|-
|align="left"| || align="center"|G/F || align="left"|Georgia || align="center"|1 || align="center"| || 52 || 676 || 90 || 41 || 180 || 13.0 || 1.7 || 0.8 || 3.5 || align=center|
|-
|align="left" bgcolor="#FFFF99"|^ (#21) || align="center"|G/F || align="left"|Georgia || align="center" bgcolor="#CFECEC"|12 || align="center"|– || bgcolor="#CFECEC"|882 || bgcolor="#CFECEC"|32,545 || 6,119 || 2,321 || bgcolor="#CFECEC"|23,292 || 36.9 || 6.9 || 2.6 || bgcolor="#CFECEC"|26.4 || align=center|
|-
|align="left"| || align="center"|G || align="left"|Rice || align="center"|1 || align="center"| || 15 || 364 || 41 || 42 || 85 || 24.3 || 2.7 || 2.8 || 5.7 || align=center|
|-
|align="left"| || align="center"|G || align="left"|Davidson || align="center"|1 || align="center"| || 6 || 19 || 2 || 0 || 2 || 3.2 || 0.3 || 0.0 || 0.3 || align=center|
|-
|align="left"| || align="center"|G/F || align="left"|Portland State || align="center"|1 || align="center"| || 23 || 189 || 12 || 19 || 110 || 8.2 || 0.5 || 0.8 || 4.8 || align=center|
|-
|align="left"| || align="center"|G || align="left"|USC || align="center"|1 || align="center"| || 33 || 481 || 40 || 139 || 138 || 14.6 || 1.2 || 4.2 || 4.2 || align=center|
|-
|align="left"| || align="center"|G || align="left"|South Gwinnett HS (GA) || align="center"|2 || align="center"|– || 99 || 2,564 || 204 || 349 || 1,176 || 25.9 || 2.1 || 3.5 || 11.9 || align=center|
|-
|align="left"| || align="center"|F || align="left"|North Carolina || align="center"|7 || align="center"|– || 487 || 14,822 || 2,582 || 654 || 5,616 || 30.4 || 5.3 || 1.3 || 11.5 || align=center|
|-
|align="left"| || align="center"|F || align="left"|Bradley || align="center"|1 || align="center"| || 5 || 14 || 1 || 0 || 0 || 2.8 || 0.2 || 0.0 || 0.0 || align=center|
|-
|align="left"| || align="center"|G || align="left"|Lincoln (MO) || align="center"|1 || align="center"| || 10 || 127 || 4 || 20 || 67 || 12.7 || 0.4 || 2.0 || 6.7 || align=center|
|-
|align="left"| || align="center"|G || align="left"|Minnesota || align="center"|1 || align="center"| || 19 || 367 || 45 || 67 || 159 || 19.3 || 2.4 || 3.5 || 8.4 || align=center|
|-
|align="left"| || align="center"|G || align="left"|North Carolina || align="center"|1 || align="center"| || 2 || 4 || 0 || 1 || 3 || 2.0 || 0.0 || 0.5 || 1.5 || align=center|
|-
|align="left"| || align="center"|F || align="left"|Duke || align="center"|2 || align="center"|– || 117 || 1,928 || 542 || 55 || 553 || 16.5 || 4.6 || 0.5 || 4.7 || align=center|
|-
|align="left"| || align="center"|G/F || align="left"|Rhode Island || align="center"|2 || align="center"|– || 47 || 1,125 || 218 || 110 || 522 || 23.9 || 4.6 || 2.3 || 11.1 || align=center|
|-
|align="left" bgcolor="#FFCC00"|+ || align="center"|F/C || align="left"|Michigan State || align="center"|11 || align="center"|–– || 753 || 22,588 || 7,332 || 827 || 10,582 || 30.0 || 9.7 || 1.1 || 14.1 || align=center|
|-
|align="left"| || align="center"|F/C || align="left"|Dwight Morrow HS (NJ) || align="center"|2 || align="center"|– || 101 || 1,419 || 458 || 44 || 485 || 14.0 || 4.5 || 0.4 || 4.8 || align=center|
|-
|align="left"| || align="center"|G || align="left"|West Virginia State || align="center"|1 || align="center"| || 63 || 1,308 || 210 || 108 || 236 || 20.8 || 3.3 || 1.7 || 3.7 || align=center|
|-
|align="left"| || align="center"|G || align="left"|Marquette || align="center"|1 || align="center"| || 2 || 2 || 0 || 1 || 0 || 1.0 || 0.0 || 0.5 || 0.0 || align=center|
|-
|align="left"| || align="center"|G || align="left"|Louisville || align="center"|2 || align="center"|– || 66 || 648 || 79 || 83 || 194 || 9.8 || 1.2 || 1.3 || 2.9 || align=center|
|-
|align="left"| || align="center"|F || align="left"|UCLA || align="center"|1 || align="center"| || 25 || 162 || 40 || 11 || 55 || 6.5 || 1.6 || 0.4 || 2.2 || align=center|
|-
|align="left"| || align="center"|G/F || align="left"|Indiana || align="center"|5 || align="center"|– || 353 || 9,460 || 608 || 1,015 || 3,522 || 26.8 || 1.7 || 2.9 || 10.0 || align=center|
|-
|align="left"| || align="center"|G/F || align="left"|North Carolina || align="center"|1 || align="center"| || 19 || 238 || 44 || 11 || 92 || 12.5 || 2.3 || 0.6 || 4.8 || align=center|
|-
|align="left"| || align="center"|G || align="left"|Cal State Fullerton || align="center"|1 || align="center"| || 14 || 79 || 6 || 19 || 48 || 5.6 || 0.4 || 1.4 || 3.4 || align=center|
|-
|align="left"| || align="center"|G || align="left"|Oral Roberts || align="center"|1 || align="center"| || 6 || 16 || 3 || 2 || 6 || 2.7 || 0.5 || 0.3 || 1.0 || align=center|
|-
|align="left"| || align="center"|F/C || align="left"|West Virginia || align="center"|1 || align="center"| || 5 || 29 || 6 || 1 || 11 || 5.8 || 1.2 || 0.2 || 2.2 || align=center|
|-
|align="left"| || align="center"|F/C || align="left"|Seattle || align="center"|1 || align="center"| || 19 || 85 || 24 || 3 || 55 || 4.5 || 1.3 || 0.2 || 2.9 || align=center|
|-
|align="left"| || align="center"|F || align="left"|Stanford || align="center"|1 || align="center"| || 4 || 20 || 6 || 0 || 5 || 5.0 || 1.5 || 0.0 || 1.3 || align=center|
|-
|align="left"| || align="center"|F/C || align="left"|Memphis || align="center"|4 || align="center"|–– || 226 || 4,376 || 1,093 || 151 || 1,515 || 19.4 || 4.8 || 0.7 || 6.7 || align=center|
|-
|align="left" bgcolor="#CCFFCC"|x || align="center"|G || align="left"|Oklahoma || align="center"|1 || align="center"| || 81 || 2,503 || 301 || 653 || 1,549 || 30.9 || 3.7 || bgcolor="#CFECEC"|8.1 || 19.1 || align=center|
|-
|align="left"| || align="center"|G/F || align="left"|St. John's || align="center"|1 || align="center"| || 9 || 299 || 28 || 23 || 136 || 33.2 || 3.1 || 2.6 || 15.1 || align=center|
|-
|align="left"| || align="center"|F/C || align="left"|North Carolina || align="center"|1 || align="center"| || 2 || 11 || 6 || 1 || 0 || 5.5 || 3.0 || 0.5 || 0.0 || align=center|
|}

External links

Atlanta Hawks all-time roster

References

National Basketball Association all-time rosters

Atlanta Hawks lists